Ottoman architecture is the architectural style that developed under the Ottoman Empire. It first emerged in northwestern Anatolia in the late 13th century and developed from earlier Seljuk Turkish architecture, with influences from Byzantine and Iranian architecture along with other architectural traditions in the Middle East. Early Ottoman architecture experimented with multiple building types over the course of the 13th to 15th centuries, progressively evolving into the Classical Ottoman style of the 16th and 17th centuries. This style was a mixture of native Turkish tradition and influences from the Hagia Sophia, resulting in monumental mosque buildings focused around a high central dome with a varying number of semi-domes. The most important architect of the Classical period is Mimar Sinan, whose major works include the Şehzade Mosque, Süleymaniye Mosque, and Selimiye Mosque. The second half of the 16th century also saw the apogee of certain decorative arts, most notably in the use of Iznik tiles.

Beginning in the 18th century, Ottoman architecture was influenced by Baroque architecture in Western Europe, resulting in the Ottoman Baroque style. The Nuruosmaniye Mosque is one of the most important examples from this period. The 19th century saw more influences imported from Western Europe, brought in by architects such as those from the Balyan family. Empire style and Neoclassical motifs were introduced and a trend towards eclecticism was evident in many types of buildings, such as the Dolmabaçe Palace. The last decades of the Ottoman Empire saw the development of a new architectural style called neo-Ottoman or Ottoman revivalism, also known as the First National Architectural Movement, by architects such as Mimar Kemaleddin and Vedat Tek.

Ottoman dynastic patronage was concentrated in the historic capitals of Bursa, Edirne, and Istanbul (Constantinople), as well as in several other important administrative centers such as Amasya and Manisa. It was in these centers that most important developments in Ottoman architecture occurred and that the most monumental Ottoman architecture can be found. Major religious monuments were typically architectural complexes, known as a külliye, that had multiple components providing different services or amenities. In addition to a mosque, these could include a madrasa, a hammam, an imaret, a sebil, a market, a caravanserai, a primary school, or others. Ottoman constructions were still abundant in Anatolia and in the Balkans (Rumelia), but in the more distant Middle Eastern and North African provinces older Islamic architectural styles continued to hold strong influence and were sometimes blended with Ottoman styles.

Early Ottoman period

Early developments 
The first Ottomans were established in northwest Anatolia near the borders of the Byzantine Empire. Their position at this frontier encouraged influences from Byzantine architecture and other ancient remains in the region, and there were examples of similar architectural experimentation by the other local dynasties of the region. One of the early Ottoman stylistic distinctions that emerged was a tradition of designing more complete façades in front of mosques, especially in the form of a portico with arches and columns. Another early distinction was the reliance on domes. The first Ottoman structures were built in Söğüt, the earliest Ottoman capital, and in nearby Bilecik, but they have not survived in their original form. They include a couple of small mosques and a mausoleum built in Ertuğrul's time (late 13th century). Bursa was captured in 1326 by the Ottoman leader Orhan. It served as the Ottoman capital until 1402, becoming a major center of patronage and construction. Orhan also captured İznik in 1331, turning it into another early center of Ottoman art. In this early period there were generally three types of mosques: the single-domed mosque, the T-plan mosque, and the multi-unit or multi-dome mosque.

Single-domed mosques 
The Hacı Özbek Mosque (1333) in İznik is the oldest Ottoman mosque with an inscription that documents its construction. It is also the first example of an Ottoman single-domed mosque, consisting of a square chamber covered by a dome. It is built in alternating layers of brick and cut stone, a technique which was likely copied from Byzantine examples and recurred in other Ottoman structures. The dome is covered in terracotta tiles, which was also a custom of early Ottoman architecture before later Ottoman domes were covered in lead. Other structures from the time of Orhan were built at İznik, Bilecik, and in Bursa. Single-domed mosques continued to be built after this, such as the example of the Green Mosque in Iznik (1378–1391), which was built by an Ottoman pasha. The Green Mosque of İznik is the first Ottoman mosque for which the name of the architect (Hacı bin Musa) is known. The main dome covers a square space, and as a result the transition between the round base of the dome and the square chamber below is achieved through a series of triangular carvings known as "Turkish triangles", a type of pendentive which was common in Anatolian Seljuk and early Ottoman architecture. An example of a single-domed mosque with a much larger dome can be found in the Yildirim Bayezid I Mosque in Mudurnu, which dates from around 1389. The ambitious dome, with a diameter of 20 meters, was comparable to much later Ottoman mosques but it had to be built closer to the ground in order to be stable. Instead of Turkish triangles the transition is made through squinches that start low along the walls.

"T-plan" mosques or zaviyes 
In 1334–1335 Orhan built a mosque outside the Yenişehir Gate in İznik which no longer stands but has been excavated and studied by archeologists. It is significant as the earliest known example of a type of building called a zaviye (a cognate of Arabic zawiya), "T-plan" mosque, or "Bursa-type" mosque. This type of building is characterized by a central courtyard, typically covered by a dome, with iwans (domed or vaulted halls that are open to the courtyard) on three sides, one of which is oriented towards the qibla (direction of prayer) and contains the mihrab (wall niche symbolizing the qibla). The front façade usually incorporated a portico along its entire width. The iwans on the side and the other various rooms attached to these buildings may have served to house Sufi students and traveling dervishes, since the Sufi brotherhoods were one of the main supporters of the early Ottomans. Variations of this floor plan were the most common type of major religious structure sponsored by the early Ottoman elites. The "Bursa-type" label comes from the fact that multiple examples of this kind were built in and around Bursa, including the Orhan Gazi Mosque (1339), the Hüdavendigar (Murad I) Mosque (1366–1385), the Yildirim Bayezid I Mosque (completed in 1395), and the Green Mosque built by Mehmed I. The Green Mosque, begun in 1412 and completed in 1424, is notable for its extensive tile decoration in the cuerda seca technique. It is the first instance of lavish tile decoration in Ottoman architecture. These mosques were all part of larger religious complexes (külliyes) that included other structures offering services such as madrasas (Islamic colleges), hammams (public bathhouses), and imarets (charitable kitchens).

Notable examples of T-plan buildings beyond Bursa include the Firuz Bey Mosque in Milas, built in 1394 by a local Ottoman governor, and the Nilüfer Hatun Imaret in Iznik, originally a zaviye built in 1388 to honor Murad I's mother. The Firuz Bey Mosque is notable for being built in stone and featuring carved decoration of high quality. Two other T-plan examples, the Beylerbeyi Mosque in Edirne (1428–1429) and the Yahşi Bey Mosque in Izmir (circa 1441–1442), are both significant as later T-plan structures with more complex decorative roof systems. In both buildings the usual side iwans are replaced by separate halls accessed through doorways from the central space. As a result, prayers were probably only held in the qibla-oriented iwan, demonstrating how zaviye buildings were often not designed as simple mosques but had more complex functions instead. In both buildings the qibla iwan is semi-octagonal in shape and is covered by a semi-dome. Large muqarnas carvings, grooving, or other geometrical carvings decorate the domes and semi-domes.

Multi-dome buildings 
The most unusual mosque of this period is the congregational mosque known as the Grand Mosque of Bursa or Ulu Cami. The mosque was commissioned by Bayezid I and funded by the booty from his victory at the Battle of Nicopolis in 1396. It was finished a few years later in 1399–1400. It is a multi-dome mosque, consisting of a large hypostyle hall divided into twenty equal bays in a rectangular four-by-five grid, each covered by a dome supported by stone piers. The dome over the middle bay of the second row has an oculus and its floor is occupied by a fountain, serving a role similar to the sahn (courtyard) in the mosques of other regions. The minbar (pulpit) of the mosque is among the finest examples of early Ottoman wooden minbars made with the kündekari technique, in which pieces of wood are fitted together without nails or glue. Its surfaces are decorated with inscriptions, floral (arabesque) motifs, and geometric motifs.

After Bayezid I suffered a disastrous defeat in 1402 at the Battle of Ankara against Timur, the capital was moved to Edirne in Thrace. Another multi-dome congregational mosque was begun here by Suleyman Çelebi in 1403 and finished by Mehmed I in 1414. It is known today as the Old Mosque (Eski Cami). It is slightly smaller than the Bursa Grand Mosque, consisting of a square floor plan divided into nine domed bays supported by four piers. This was the last major multi-dome mosque built by the Ottomans (with some exceptions such as the later Piyale Pasha Mosque). In later periods, the multi-dome building type was adapted for use in non-religious buildings instead. One example of this is the bedesten – a kind of market hall at the center of a bazaar – which Bayezid I built in Bursa during his reign. A similar bedesten was built in Edirne by Mehmed I between 1413 and 1421.

Murad II and the Üç Şerefeli Mosque 
The period of Murad II (between 1421 and 1451) saw the continuation of some traditions and the introduction of new innovations. Although the capital was at Edirne, Murad II had his funerary complex (the Muradiye Complex) built in Bursa between 1424 and 1426. It included a mosque (heavily restored in the 19th century), a madrasa, an imaret, and a mausoleum. Its cemetery developed into a royal necropolis when later mausoleums were built here, although Murad II was the only sultan buried here. Murad II's mausoleum is unique among royal Ottoman tombs as its central dome has an opening to the sky and his son's mausoleum was built directly adjacent to it, as per the sultan's last wishes. The madrasa of the complex is one of the most architecturally accomplished of this period and one of the few of its kind from this period to survive. It has a square courtyard with a central fountain (shadirvan) surrounded by a domed portico, behind which are vaulted rooms. On the southeast side of the courtyard is a large domed classroom (dershane), whose entrance façade (facing the courtyard) features some tile decoration. In Edirne Murad II built another zaviye for Sufis in 1435, now known as the Murad II Mosque. It repeats the Bursa-type plan and also features rich tile decoration similar to the Green Mosque in Bursa, as well as new blue-and-white tiles with Chinese influences.

The most important mosque of this period is the Üç Şerefeli Mosque, begun by Murad II in 1437 and finished in 1447. It has a very different design from earlier mosques. The floor plan is nearly square but is divided between a rectangular courtyard and a rectangular prayer hall. The courtyard has a central fountain and is surrounded by a portico of arches and domes, with a decorated central portal leading into the courtyard from the outside and another one leading from the courtyard into the prayer hall. The prayer hall is centered around a huge dome which covers most of the middle part of the hall, while the sides of the hall are covered by pairs of smaller domes. The central dome, 24 meters in diameter (or 27 meters according to Kuban), is much larger than any other Ottoman dome built before this. On the outside, this results in an early example of the "cascade of domes" visual effect seen in later Ottoman mosques, although the overall arrangement here is described by Sheila Blair and Jonathan Bloom as not yet successful compared to later examples. The mosque has a total of four minarets, arranged around the four corners of the courtyard. Its southwestern minaret was the tallest Ottoman minaret built up to that time and features three balconies, from which the mosque's name derives.

The overall form of the Üç Şerefeli Mosque, with its central-dome prayer hall, arcaded court with fountain, minarets, and tall entrance portals, foreshadowed the features of later Ottoman mosque architecture. It has been described as a "crossroads of Ottoman architecture", marking the culmination of architectural experimentation with different spatial arrangements during the period of the Beyliks and the early Ottomans. Kuban describes it as the "last stage in Early Ottoman architecture", while the central dome plan and the "modular" character of its design signaled the direction of future Ottoman architecture in Istanbul.

Mehmed II and early Ottoman Istanbul 

Mehmed II succeeded his father temporarily in 1444 and definitively in 1451. He is also known as "Fatih" or the Conqueror after his conquest of Constantinople in 1453, which brought the remains of the Byzantine Empire to an end. Mehmed was strongly interested in Turkish, Persian, and European cultures and sponsored artists and writers at his court. Before the 1453 conquest his capital remained at Edirne, where he completed a new palace for himself in 1452–53. He made extensive preparations for the siege, including the construction of a large fortress known as Rumeli Hisarı on the western shore of the Bosphorus, begun in 1451-52 and completed shortly before the siege in 1453. This was located across from an older fortress on the eastern shore known as Anadolu Hisarı, built by Bayezid I in the 1390s for an earlier siege, and was designed to cut off communications to the city through the Bosphorus. Rumeli Hisarı remains one of the most impressive medieval Ottoman fortifications. It consists of three large round towers connected by curtain walls, with an irregular layout adapted to the topography of the site. A small mosque was built inside the fortified enclosure. The towers once had conical roofs, but these disappeared in the 19th century.

After the conquest of Constantinople (now known as Istanbul), one of Mehmed's first constructions in the city was a palace, known as the Old Palace (Eski Saray), built in 1455 on the site of what is now the main campus of Istanbul University. At the same time Mehmed built another fortress, Yedikule ("Seven Towers"), at the south end of the city's land walls in order to house and protect the treasury. It was completed in 1457–1458. Unlike Rumeli Hisarı, it has a regular layout in the shape of a five-pointed star, possibly of Italian inspiration. In order to revitalize commerce, Mehmed built the first bedesten in Istanbul between 1456 and 1461, variously known as the Inner Bedesten (Iç Bedesten), Old Bedesten (Eski Bedesten or Bedesten-i Atik), or the Jewellers' Bedesten (Cevahir Bedesteni). A second bedesten, the Sandal Bedesten, also known as the Small Bedesten (Küçük Bedesten) or New Bedesten (Bedesten-i Cedid), was built by Mehmed about a dozen years later. These two bedestens, each consisting of a large multi-dome hall, form the original core of what is now the Grand Bazaar, which grew around them over the following generations. The nearby Tahtakale Hammam, the oldest hammam (public bathhouse) of the city, also dates from around this time. The only other documented hammams in the city which date from the time of Mehmet II are the Mahmut Pasha Hamam (part of the Mahmut Pasha Mosque's complex) built in 1466 and the Gedik Ahmet Pasha Hamam built around 1475.

In 1459 Mehmed II began construction of a second palace, known as the New Palace (Yeni Saray) and later as the Topkapi Palace ("Cannon-Gate Palace"), on the site of the former acropolis of Byzantium, a hill overlooking the Bosphorus. The palace was mostly laid out between 1459 and 1465. Initially it remained mostly an administrative palace, while the residence of the sultan remained at the Old Palace. It only became a royal residence in the 16th century, when the harem section was constructed. The palace has been repeatedly modified over subsequent centuries by different rulers, with the palace today now representing an accumulation of different styles and periods. Its overall layout appears highly irregular, consisting of several courtyards and enclosures within a precinct delimited by an outer wall. The seemingly irregular layout of the palace was in fact a reflection of a clear hierarchical organization of functions and private residences, with the innermost areas reserved for the privacy of the sultan and his innermost circle. Among the structures today that date from Mehmet's time is the Fatih Kiosk or Pavilion of Mehmed II, located on the east side of the Third Court and built in 1462–1463. It consists of a series of domed chambers preceded by an arcaded portico on the palace-facing side. It stands on top of a heavy substructure built into the hillside overlooking the Bosphorus. This lower level also originally served as a treasury. The presence of strongly-built foundation walls and substructures like this was a common characteristic of Ottoman construction in this palace as well as other architectural complexes. Bab-ı Hümayun, the main outer entrance to the palace grounds, dates from Mehmet II's time according to an inscription that gives the date 1478–1479, but it was covered in new marble during the 19th century. Kuban also argues that the Babüsselam (Gate of Salution), the gate to the Second Court flanked by two towers, dates to the time Mehmed II. Within the outer gardens of the palace, Mehmed II commissioned three pavilions built in three different styles. One pavilion was in Ottoman style, another in Greek style, and a third one in a Persian style. Of these, only the Persian pavilion, known as the Tiled Kiosk (Çinili Köşk), has survived. It was completed in September or October 1472 and its name derives from its rich tile decoration, including the first appearance of Iranian-inspired banna'i tilework in Istanbul. The vaulting and cruciform layout of the building's interior is also based on Iranian precedents, while the exterior is fronted by a tall portico. Although not much is known about the builders, they were likely of Iranian origin, as historical documents indicate the presence of tilecutters from Khorasan.

Mehmed's largest contribution to religious architecture was the Fatih Mosque complex in Istanbul, built from 1463 to 1470. It was part of a very large külliye which also included a tabhane (guesthouse for travelers), an imaret, a darüşşifa (hospital), a caravanserai (hostel for traveling merchants), a mektep (primary school), a library, a hammam, shops, a cemetery with the founder's mausoleum, and eight madrasas along with their annexes. Not all of these structures have survived to the present day. The buildings largely ignored any existing topography and were arranged in a strongly symmetrical layout on a vast square terrace with the monumental mosque at its center. The architect of the mosque complex was Usta Sinan, known as Sinan the Elder. It was located on the Fourth Hill of Istanbul, which was until then occupied by the ruined Byzantine Church of the Holy Apostles. Unfortunately, much of the mosque was destroyed by an earthquake in 1766, causing it to be largely rebuilt by Mustafa III in a significantly altered form shortly afterwards. Only the walls and porticos of the mosque's courtyard and the marble entrance to the prayer hall have survived overall from the original mosque. The form of the rest of the mosque has had to be reconstructed by scholars using historical sources and illustrations. The design likely reflected the combination of the Byzantine church tradition (especially the Hagia Sophia) with the Ottoman tradition that had evolved since the early imperial mosques of Bursa and Edirne. Drawing on the ideas established by the earlier Üç Şerefeli Mosque, the mosque consisted of a rectangular courtyard with a surrounding gallery leading to a domed prayer hall. The prayer hall consisted of a large central dome with a semi-dome behind it (on the qibla side) and flanked by a row of three smaller domes on either side.

The reign of Bayezid II 

After Mehmed II, the reign of Bayezid II (1481–1512) is again marked by extensive architectural patronage, of which the two most outstanding and influential examples are the Bayezid II Complex in Edirne and the Bayezid II Mosque in Istanbul. While it was a period of further experimentation, the Mosque of Bayezid II in Amasya, completed in 1486, was still based on the Bursa-type plan, representing the last and largest imperial mosque in this style. Doğan Kuban regards the constructions of Bayzezid II as also constituting deliberate attempts at urban planning, extending the legacy of the Fatih Mosque complex in Istanbul.

The Bayezid II Complex in Edirne is a complex (külliye) of buildings including a mosque, a darüşşifa, an imaret, a madrasa, a tımarhane (asylum for the mentally ill), two tabhanes, a bakery, latrines, and other services, all linked together on the same site. It was commissioned by Bayezid II in 1484 and completed in 1488 under the direction of the architect Hayrettin. The various structures of the complex have relatively simple but strictly geometrical floor plans, built of stone with lead-covered roofs, with only sparse decoration in the form of alternating coloured stone around windows and arches. This has been described as an "Ottoman classical architectural aesthetic at an early stage in its development". The mosque lies at the heart of the complex. It has an austere square prayer hall covered by a large high dome. The hall is preceded by a rectangular courtyard with a fountain and a surrounding arcade. The darüşşifa, whose function was the main motivation behind Bayezid's construction of the complex, has two inner courtyards that lead to a structure with a hexagonal floor plan featuring small domed rooms arranged around a larger central dome.

The Bayezid II Mosque in Istanbul was built between 1500 and 1505 under the direction of the architect Ya'qub or Yakubshah (although Hayrettin is also mentioned in documents). It too was part of a larger complex, which included a madrasa (serving today as a Museum of Turkish Calligraphy Art), a monumental hammam (the Bayezid II Hamam), hospices, an imaret, a caravanserai, and a cemetery around the sultan's mausoleum. The mosque itself, the largest building, once again consists of a courtyard leading to the square prayer hall. However, the prayer hall now makes use of two semi-domes aligned with the main central dome, while the side aisles are each covered by four smaller domes. Compared to earlier mosques, this results in a much more sophisticated "cascade of domes" effect for the building's exterior profile, likely reflecting influences from the Hagia Sophia and the original (now disappeared) Fatih Mosque. The mosque is the culmination of this period of architectural exploration under Bayezid II and the last step towards the classical Ottoman style. The deliberate arrangement of established Ottoman architectural elements into a strongly symmetrical design is one aspect which denotes this evolution.

Classical period
The start of the Classical period is strongly associated with the works of Mimar Sinan. During this period the bureaucracy of the Ottoman state, whose foundations were laid in Istanbul by Mehmet II, became increasingly elaborate and the profession of the architect became further institutionalized. The long reign of Suleiman the Magnificent is also recognized as the apogee of Ottoman political and cultural development, with extensive patronage in art and architecture by the sultan, his family, and his high-ranking officials. The master architect of the Classical period, Mimar Sinan, served as the chief court architect (mimarbaşi) from 1538 until his death in 1588. Sinan credited himself with the design of over 300 buildings, though another estimate of his works puts it at nearly 500. He is credited with designing buildings as far as Buda (present-day Budapest) and Mecca. Sinan was probably not present to directly supervise projects far from the capital, so in these cases his designs were most likely executed by his assistants or by local architects. In this period Ottoman architecture, especially under the work and influence of Sinan, saw a new unification and harmonization of the various architectural elements and influences that Ottoman architecture had previously absorbed but which had not yet been harmonized into a collective whole. Ottoman architecture used a limited set of general forms – such as domes, semi-domes, and arcaded porticos – which were repeated in every structure and could be combined in a limited number of ways. The ingenuity of successful architects such as Sinan lay in the careful and calculated attempts to solve problems of space, proportion, and harmony. This period is also notable for the development of Iznik tile decoration in Ottoman monuments, with the artistic peak of this medium beginning in the second half of the 16th century.

Earliest buildings of Suleiman's reign 
Between the reigns of Bayezid II and Suleiman I, the reign of Selim I saw relatively little building activity. The Yavuz Selim Mosque complex in Istanbul, dedicated to Selim and containing his tomb, was completed after his death by Suleiman in 1522. It was quite possibly founded by Suleiman too, though the exact foundation date is not known. The mosque is modelled on the Mosque of Bayezid II in Edirne, consisting of one large single-domed chamber. The mosque is sometimes attributed to Sinan but it was not designed by him and the architect in charge is not known. Other notable architectural complexes before Sinan's architect career, at the end of Selim I's reign or in Suleiman's early reign, are the Hafsa Sultan or Sultaniye Mosque in Manisa (circa 1522), the Fatih Pasha Mosque in Diyarbakir (completed in 1520 or 1523), and the Çoban Mustafa Pasha Complex in Gebze (1523–1524).

Prior to being appointed chief court architect, Sinan was a military engineer who assisted the army on campaigns. His first major non-military project was the Hüsrev Pasha Mosque complex in Aleppo, one of the first major Ottoman monuments in that city. Its mosque and madrasa were completed in 1536–1537, though the completion of the overall complex is dated by an inscription to 1545, by which point Sinan had already moved on to Istanbul. After his appointment to chief court architect in 1538, Sinan's first commission for Suleiman's family was the Haseki Hürrem Complex in Istanbul, dated to 1538–1539. He also built the Tomb of Hayrettin Barbaros in the Beşiktaş neighbourhood in 1541.

The Şehzade Mosque and other early works of Sinan 

Sinan's first major commission was the Şehzade Mosque complex, which Suleiman dedicated to Şehzade Mehmed, his son who died in 1543. The mosque complex was built between 1545 and 1548. Like all imperial külliyes, it included multiple buildings, of which the mosque was the most prominent element. The mosque has a rectangular floor plan divided into two equal squares, with one square occupied by the courtyard and the other occupied by the prayer hall. Two minarets stand on either side at the junction of these two squares. The prayer hall consists of a central dome surrounded by semi-domes on four sides, with smaller domes occupying the corners. Smaller semi-domes also fill the space between the corner domes and the main semi-domes.

This design represents the culmination of the previous domed and semi-domed buildings in Ottoman architecture, bringing complete symmetry to the dome layout. An early version of this design, on a smaller scale, had been used before Sinan as early as 1520 or 1523 in the Fatih Pasha Mosque in Diyarbakir. While a cross-like layout had symbolic meaning in Christian architecture, in Ottoman architecture this was purely focused on heightening and emphasizing the central dome. Sinan's early innovations are also evident in the way he organized the structural supports of the dome. Instead of having the dome rest on thick walls all around it (as was previously common), he concentrated the load-bearing supports into a limited number of buttresses along the outer walls of the mosque and in four pillars inside the mosque itself at the corners of the dome. This allowed for the walls in between the buttresses to be thinner, which in turn allowed for more windows to bring in more light. Sinan also moved the outer walls inward, near the inner edge of the buttresses, so that the latter were less visible inside the mosque. On the outside, he added domed porticos along the lateral façades of the building which further obscured the buttresses and gave the exterior a greater sense of monumentality. Even the four pillars inside the mosque were given irregular shapes to give them a less heavy-handed appearance.

The basic design of the Şehzade Mosque, with its symmetrical dome and four semi-dome layout, proved popular with later architects and was repeated in classical Ottoman mosques after Sinan (e.g. the Sultan Ahmed I Mosque, the New Mosque at Eminönü, and the 18th-century reconstruction of the Fatih Mosque). It is even found in the 19th-century Muhammad Ali Mosque in Cairo. Despite this legacy and the symmetry of its design, Sinan considered the Sehzade Mosque his "apprentice" work and was not satisfied with it. During the rest of his career he did not repeat its layout in any of his other works. He instead experimented with other designs that seemed to aim for a completely unified interior space and for ways to emphasize the visitor's perception of the main dome upon entering a mosque. One of the results of this logic was that any space that did not belong the central domed space was reduced to a minimum, subordinate role, if not altogether absent.

Around the same time as the Şehzade Mosque construction Sinan also built the Mihrimah Sultan Mosque (also known as the Iskele Mosque) for one of Suleiman's daughters, Mihrimah Sultan. It was completed in 1547–1548 and is located in Üsküdar, across the Bosphorus. It is notable for its wide "double porch", with an inner portico surrounded by an outer portico at the end of a sloped roof. This feature proved popular for certain patrons and was repeated by Sinan in several other mosques. One example is the Rüstem Pasha Mosque in Tekirdağ (1552–1553). Another example is the Sulaymaniyya Takiyya in Damascus, the western part of which (the mosque and a hospice) was built in 1554–1559. This complex is also an important example of a Sinan-designed mosque far from Istanbul, and has local Syrian influences such as the use of ablaq masonry. For Rüstem Pasha, Suleiman's grand vizier and son-in-law, Sinan also built the Rüstem Pasha Madrasa in Istanbul (1550), with an octagonal floor plan, and several caravanserais including the Rüstem Pasha Han in Galata (1550), the Rüstem Pasha Han in Ereğli (1552), the Rüstem Pasha Han in Edirne (1554), and the Taş Han in Erzurum (between 1544 and 1561). In Istanbul Sinan also built the Haseki Hürrem Hamam near Hagia Sophia in 1556–1557, one of the most famous hammams he designed, which includes two equally-sized sections for men and women. Between 1554 and 1564 he was also charged with upgrading the water supply system of the city, for which he built several impressive aqueducts in the Belgrad Forest and expanded on the older Byzantine water supply system. One of Sinan's assistants, Hayruddin, was responsible for building the Stari Most, a single-span bridge in Mostar (present-day Bosnia and Herzegovina) that is considered one of the most impressive Ottoman monuments in the Balkans. It was originally built between 1557 and 1566.

The Süleymaniye complex and after 

In 1550 Sinan began construction for the Süleymaniye complex, a monumental religious and charitable complex dedicated to Suleiman. Construction finished in 1557. Following the example of the earlier Fatih complex, it consists of many buildings arranged around the main mosque in the center, on a planned site occupying the summit of a hill in Istanbul. The buildings included the mosque itself, four general madrasas, a madrasa specialized for medicine, a madrasa specialized for hadiths (darülhadis), a mektep (Qur'anic school for children), a darüşşifa (hospital), a caravanserai, a tabhane (guesthouse), an imaret (public kitchen), a hammam, rows of shops, and a cemetery with two mausoleums. In order to adapt the hilltop site, Sinan had to begin by laying solid foundations and retaining walls to form a wide terrace. The overall layout of buildings is less rigidly symmetrical than the Fatih complex, as Sinan opted to integrate it more flexibly into the existing urban fabric. Thanks to its refined architecture, its scale, its dominant position on the city skyline, and its role as a symbol of Suleiman's powerful reign, the Süleymaniye Mosque complex is one of the most important symbols of Ottoman architecture and is often considered by scholars to be the most magnificent mosque in Istanbul.

The mosque itself has a form similar to that of the earlier Bayezid II Mosque: a central dome preceded and followed by semi-domes, with smaller domes covering the sides. The reuse of an older mosque layout is something Sinan did not normally do. Doğan Kuban has suggested that it may have been due to a request from Suleiman. In particular, the building replicates the central dome layout of the Hagia Sophia and this may be interpreted as a desire by Suleiman to emulate the structure of the Hagia Sophia, demonstrating how this ancient monument continued to hold tremendous symbolic power in Ottoman culture. Nonetheless, Sinan employed innovations similar to those he used previously in the Şehzade Mosque: he concentrated the load-bearing supports into a limited number of columns and pillars, which allowed for more windows in the walls and minimized the physical separations within the interior of the prayer hall. The exterior façades of the mosque are characterized by ground-level porticos, wide arches in which sets of windows are framed, and domes and semi-domes that progressively culminate upwards – in a roughly pyramidal fashion – to the large central dome. 
After designing the Süleymaniye complex, Sinan appears to have focused on experimenting with the single-domed space. In the 1550s and 1560s he experimented with an "octagonal baldaquin" design for the main dome, in which the dome rests on an octagonal drum supported by a system of eight pillars or buttresses. This can be seen in the early Hadim Ibrahim Pasha Mosque (1551) and the later Rüstem Pasha Mosque (1561), both in Istanbul. The Rüstem Pasha Mosque, one of the most notable mosques in the city, is raised on top of an artificial platform whose substructure is occupied by shops and a vaulted warehouse that provided revenues for the mosque's upkeep. Most famously, the mosque's exterior portico and the walls of its interior are covered in a wide array of Iznik tiles, unprecedented in Ottoman architecture. Sinan usually kept decoration limited and subordinate to the overall architecture, so this exception is possibly the result of a request by the wealthy patron, grand vizier Rüstem Pasha.

In Lüleburgaz, Sinan designed his first mosque with a "square baldaquin" structure, where the dome rests on a support system with a square layout (without the semi-domes of the Şehzade Mosque design). The mosque was part of a religious and commercial complex built for vizier Sokollu Mehmed Pasha begun in 1559–1560 and completed in 1565–1566 or in 1569–1571. The complex was designed to act as a staging post (or menzil) for travelers and traders and it included a mosque, a madrasa, a caravanserai, a hammam, and a mektep (primary school), all of which is centered around a market street (arasta). Similar complexes were built on many trade routes across the empire in this era. Not long after this Mihrimah Sultan sponsored a second mosque, the Mihrimah Sultan Mosque in the Edirnekapı area of Istanbul, built between 1562 and 1565. Here Sinan employed a larger square baldaquin structure with a dome resting on four corner buttresses, filliing the walls between the buttresses with a multitude of windows which introduced an unusual amount of light into the interior.

For much of his career Sinan also experimented with variations of a "hexagonal baldaquin" design, a design that was uncommon in world architecture. He used this model in the Sinan Pasha Mosque (1553–1555) in Beşiktaş, the Kara Ahmed Pasha Mosque (1554) in western Istanbul, the Molla Çelebi Mosque (circa 1561–1562) in Beyoğlu, the Sokollu Mehmed Pasha Mosque (1571) in the Kadırga neighbourhood, and the Atik Valide Mosque (1583) in Üsküdar. The Sokollu Mehmed Pasha Mosque in Kadırga is one of the most accomplished designs of his late career and with this type of configuration. In this mosque he completely integrated the supporting columns of the hexagonal baldaquin into the outer walls for the first time, thus creating a unified interior space. The mosque's interior is also notable for the revetment of Iznik tiles on the wall around the mihrab and on the pendentives of the main dome, creating one of the best compositions of tilework decoration in this period.

The Selimiye Mosque and Sinan's late works 
Sinan's crowning masterpiece is the Selimiye Mosque in Edirne, which was begun in 1568 and completed in 1574 (or possibly 1575). It forms the major element of another imperial complex of buildings. The mosque building consists of two equal parts: a rectangular courtyard and a rectangular prayer hall. The prayer hall's interior is notable for being completely dominated by a single massive dome, whose view is unimpeded by the structural elements seen in other large domed mosques before this. This design is the culmination of Sinan's spatial experiments, making use of the octagonal baldaquin as the most effective method of integrating the round dome with the rectangular hall below by minimizing the space occupied by the supporting elements of the dome. The dome is supported on eight massive pillars which are partly freestanding but closely integrated with the outer walls. Additional outer buttresses are concealed in the walls of the mosque, allowing the walls in between to be pierced with a large number of windows. Four semi-dome squinches occupy the corners but they are much smaller in proportion to the main dome. Sinan also made good use of the spaces between the pillars and buttresses by filling them with an elevated gallery on the inside and arched porticos on the outside. The elevated galleries inside helped to eliminate what little ground-level space existed beyond the central domed baldaquin structure, ensuring that the dome therefore dominated the view from anywhere a visitor could stand. Sinan's biographies praise the dome for its size and height, which is approximately the same diameter as the Hagia Sophia's main dome and slightly higher; the first time that this had been achieved in Ottoman architecture. The mihrab, carved in marble, is set within a recessed and slightly elevated apse projecting outward from the rest of the mosque, allowing it to be illuminated by windows on three sides. The walls on either side of the mihrab are decorated with excellent Iznik tiles, as is the sultan's private balcony for prayers in the mosque's eastern corner. The minbar of the mosque is among the finest examples of the stone minbars which by then had become common in Ottoman architecture. The stone surfaces are decorated with arches, pierced geometric motifs, and carved arabesques.
In the precincts of Hagia Sophia Sinan built the Tomb of Selim II, one of the largest Ottoman domed mausoleums, in 1576–1577. In Topkapı Palace one of his most notable works, the Chamber or Pavilion of Murad III, was built in 1578. In 1580 he built the Şemsi Pasha Complex, a small mosque, tomb, and medrese complex on the waterside of Üsküdar which is considered one of the best small mosques he designed. In 1580–1581 he built the Kılıç Ali Pasha Complex in the Tophane neighbourhood. Notably, this mosque is a miniature version of the Hagia Sophia. It is once again possible that this unusual copying of an earlier monument was a request by the patron, Kılıç Ali Pasha.

Sinan's last large-scale commission was the Atik Valide Mosque, founded by Nurbanu Sultan on the southern edge of Üsküdar. It was the largest külliye and mosque complex Sinan built after the Süleymaniye. It was completed in 1583, when Nurbanu died, but Sinan probably began work on it in the 1570s. It consists of numerous structure across a sprawling site. Unlike the earlier Fatih and Süleymaniye complexes, and despite the large available space, there was no attempt at creating a unified or symmetrical design across the entire complex. This may suggest that Sinan did not regard this characteristic as necessary to the design of an ideal mosque complex.

Among Sinan's last works before his death are the Murad III Mosque in Manisa, built between 1583 and 1585 under the supervision of his assistants Mahmud and Mehmed Agha, as well as the modest Ramazan Efendi Mosque in Istanbul, built in 1586. Upon his death in 1588, Sinan was buried in a tomb he designed for himself at a street corner next to the Süleymaniye complex in Istanbul.

Classical architecture after Sinan 
After Sinan, the classical style became less creative and more repetitive by comparison with earlier periods. Davud Agha succeeded Sinan as chief architect. Among his most notable works, all in Istanbul, are the Cerrahpaşa Mosque (1593), the Koca Sinan Pasha Complex on Divanyolu (1593), the Gazanfer Ağa Medrese complex (1596), and the Tomb of Murad III (completed in 1599). Some scholars argue that the Nışançı Mehmed Pasha Mosque (1584–1589), whose architect is unknown, should be attributed to him based on its date and style. Its design is considered highly accomplished and it may be one of the first mosques to be fronted by a garden courtyard. Davud Agha was one of the few architects of this period to display great potential and to create designs that went beyond Sinan's designs, but unfortunately he died of the plague right before the end of the 16th century. After this, the two largest mosques built in the 17th century were both modelled on the form of the older Şehzade Mosque: the Sultan Ahmed I Mosque and the New Mosque in Eminönü.

The Sultan Ahmed I Mosque, also known as the Blue Mosque, was begun in 1609 and completed in 1617. It was designed by Sinan's apprentice, Mehmed Agha. The mosque's size, location, and decoration suggest it was intended to be a rival to the nearby Hagia Sophia. The larger complex includes a market, madrasa, and the Tomb of Ahmed I, while other structures have not survived. In the mosque's prayer hall the central dome is flanked by four semi-domes just like the Şehzade Mosque, with additional smaller semi-domes opening from each larger semi-dome. The four pillars supporting the central dome are massive and more imposing than in Sinan's mosques. The lower walls are lavishly decorated with Iznik tiles: historical archives record that over 20,000 tiles were purchased for the purpose. On the outside, Mehmed Agha opted to achieve a "softer" profile with the cascade of domes and the various curving elements, differing from the more dramatic juxtaposition of domes and vertical elements seen in earlier classical mosques by Sinan. It is also the only Ottoman mosque to have as many as six minarets. After the Sultan Ahmed I Mosque, no further great imperial mosques dedicated to a sultan were built in Istanbul until the mid-18th century. Mosques continued to be built and dedicated to other dynastic family members, but the tradition of sultans building their own monumental mosques lapsed.

Some of the best examples of early 17th-century Ottoman architecture are the Revan Kiosk (1635) and Baghdad Kiosk (1639) in Topkapı Palace, built by Murad IV to commemorate his victories against the Safavids. Both are small pavilions raised on platforms overlooking the palace gardens. Both are harmoniously decorated on the inside and outside with predominantly blue and white tiles and richly-inlaid window shutters.

The New Mosque or Yeni Valide Mosque at Eminönü was initially begun by architect Davud Agha in 1597, sponsored by Safiye Sultan. However, Davud Agha's death a year or two after, followed by the death of Safiye Sultan in 1603, caused construction to be abandoned. It was only resumed on the initiative of Hatice Turhan Sultan in 1661 and finished in 1663. The complex includes the mosque, a mausoleum for Hatice Turhan, a private pavilion for the sultan and the royal family, and a covered market known as the Egyptian Market (Mısır Çarşısı; known today as the Spice Bazaar). Its courtyard and interior are richly decorated with Iznik or Kütahya tiles, as well as with stone-carved muqarnas and vegetal rumi motifs. The similarly named Yeni Valide Mosque complex, built in 1708–1711 in Üsküdar, was one of the last major monuments built in the classical style in Istanbul before the rise of the Tulip Period style.

Tulip Period and early 18th century 
From the 18th century onward European influences were introduced into Ottoman architecture as the Ottoman Empire itself became more open to outside influences. The term “Baroque” is sometimes applied more widely to Ottoman art and architecture across the 18th century including the Tulip Period. In more specific terms, however, the period after the 17th century is marked by several different styles. The beginning of Ahmed III's reign in 1703 saw the royal court return to Istanbul after a long period of residence in Edirne in the late 17th century. Ünver Rüstem states that constructions from the first years of Ahmed III's reign demonstrate that the new "Tulip Period" style was already in existence by then. The historical period known as the “Tulip Period” or "Tulip Era" is considered to have begun in 1718, after the Treaty of Passarowitz, and lasted until the Patrona Halil revolts of 1730, when Ahmed III was overthrown. The treaty formalized Ottoman territorial losses but also initiated a period of peace. It inaugurated a new era of growing cross-cultural exchange and curiosity between the Ottoman Empire and Western Europe. The period saw significant influence from the French Rococo style (part of the wider Baroque style) that emerged around this time under the reign of Louis XV. In 1720 an Ottoman embassy led by Yirmisekiz Çelebi Mehmed Efendi was sent to Paris and when it returned in 1721 it brought back reports and illustrations of the French Baroque style which made a strong impression in the sultan's court. In addition to European influences, the decoration of the Tulip Period was also influenced by Safavid art and architecture to the east.

Palace architecture of Ahmed III 

In 1705, soon after Ahmed III returned the royal court to Istanbul, a new dining room was added to the Harem of Topkapi Palace next to the Chamber of Murad III and the Chamber of Ahmed I. Known today as the "Fruit Room", the room is notable for its imagery of flower vases and fruit bowls painted onto wooden panels. While floral motifs were well-established in Ottoman art and decoration before this, these paintings distinguished themselves from earlier examples by their naturalism. This reflected an influence from the modes of representation in contemporary European art. Ahmed III also built a library in the Third Court of Topkapı Palace (inside the Enderun School) which was completed in 1719, right before Yirmisekiz's embassy to Paris. It is built in the late classical style, but some of its details foreshadow an end to the classical style, such as the absence of pendentives in the corners of the domes and the style of the windows. The construction of stand-alone library structures was itself a new trend influenced by European ideas, as the Ottomans traditionally did not build libraries except as secondary elements attached to religious complexes. The Köprülü Library built in 1678 was the first of its kind, while other early examples date from the reign of Ahmed III.
One of the most important creations of the Tulip Period was the Sadâbâd Palace, a new summer palace designed and built by Damat Ibrahim Pasha in 1722–1723 for Ahmed III. It was located at Kâğıthane, a rural area on the outskirts of the city with small rivers that flow into the Golden Horn inlet. The palace grounds included a long marble-lined canal, the Cedval-i Sim, around which were gardens, pavilions, and palace apartments in a landscaped setting. This overall design probably emulated French pleasure palaces as a result of Yirmisekiz's reports about Paris and Versailles. The main palace building belonging to the sultan himself consisted of a single block, which may be the first time that an Ottoman palace was designed like this, in contrast with the multiple pavilions and courtyards of the Topkapı Palace. In addition to his own palace, however, the sultan encouraged members of his court to build their own separate pavilions along the canal. The regular inhabitants of Istanbul also used the surrounding area as a recreational ground for excursions and picnics. This was a new practice in Ottoman culture that brought the public within close proximity of the ruler's abode for the first time and it was noted by contemporary art and literature such as in the poems of Nedîm and in the Zenanname (Book of Women") by Enderûnlu Fâzıl.

During the Patrona Halil revolts of 1730 the pavilions and gardens of the upper elites were destroyed by mobs, but the sultan's palace itself survived. It was repaired by Selim III (r. 1789–1807) and rebuilt by Mahmud II (r. 1808–1839), before being demolished by Abdülaziz (r. 1861–1876) and replaced with the Çağlayan Palace. Ottoman wooden mansions continued to be built on the shores of the Golden Horn and the Bosphorus until the 20th century, although they continued to be based on traditional models of Ottoman domestic architecture.

Tulip Period fountains and sebils 
The culmination of the Tulip Period style is represented by a series of monumental stand-alone fountains that were mostly built between 1728 and 1732. Water took on an enlarged role in architecture and the urban landscape of Istanbul during the Tulip Period. In the first half of the 18th century Istanbul's water supply infrastructure, including the aqueducts in Belgrade Forest, were renovated and expanded. In 1732 an important water distribution structure, the taksim, was first built on what is now Taksim Square. The new fountains were unprecedented in Ottoman architecture. Previously, fountains and sebils only existed as minor elements of larger charitable complexes or as shadirvans inside mosque courtyards. The maidan fountain, or a stand-alone fountain at the center of a city square, was introduced for the first time in this period. The first and most remarkable of these is the Ahmed III Fountain built in 1728 next to the Hagia Sophia and in front of the outer gate of Topkapı Palace. It consists of a square structure with rounded corners, surmounted by a roof with five small domes and very wide eaves projecting out over the sides of the structure. Each of the four façades of the square structure features a wall fountain, while each of the four rounded corners is occupied by a sebil. Water was drawn from a cistern inside the structure. The stone walls on the exterior are carved with very fine vegetal ornamentation and calligraphic inscriptions. Acanthus leaves and other motifs of Baroque Rococo appearance are carved under the projecting eaves of the roof. Painting was applied to highlight some carved details, a practice that become common in the 18th century. The "S" and "C" curves of Baroque architecture, which were to become popular in later years, also make an early appearance in some of the fountain's details.

Another fountain was built by Ahmed III in the same year at Üsküdar, near the old Mihrimah Sultan Mosque. This fountain is a slightly simplified version of the other one and lacks the corner sebils, which are replaced with corner fountains instead. A more ornate example, this time built by Mahmud I in 1732, is the Tophane Fountain built next to the old Kılıç Ali Pasha Mosque at Tophane. Further northeast is the Hekimoglu Ali Pasha Fountain, also built in 1732, which has only two decorated façades with fountains. Other important examples of fountains and sebils from the same year are the Saliha Sultan Sebil in the Azapkapi neighbourhood and the Bereketzade Fountain located near Galata Tower.

Early 18th-century religious complexes 
The Damat Ibrahim Pasha Complex, built by Ahmed III's grand vizier in 1720 and located near the Şehzade Mosque, is one of the most notable religious complexes built in this period. It functioned as a darülhadis (hadith school) and includes a library, a small mosque and classroom, student cells arranged around a courtyard, a cemetery near the street, and a sebil at the street corner. The sebil features some of the best ornamentation of the period. The same patron also built the Ibrahim Pasha Moque in his hometown of Nevşehir in 1726. The mosque is still mostly Classical in form except in some details such as the unusually thin buttresses around the dome exterior. The Tulip Period style also influenced the architecture of the Rızvaniye Mosque complex (1721–1722), one of the most famous religious complexes in Urfa, which was built next to the Balıklıgöl pool. The complex is known for the long decorative portico which stretches along the pool and opens onto the madrasa of the complex. The details most clearly belonging to the Tulip Period are the floral decoration in the mosque's doorway and its mihrab.

The last major monument of the Tulip Period stage in Ottoman architecture is the Hekimoğlu Ali Pasha Mosque complex completed in 1734–1735 and sponsored by Hekimoğlu Ali Pasha. This mosque reflects an overall Classical form and is very similar to the nearby Cerrah Pasha Mosque (late 16th century), but the flexible placement of the various components of the complex around a garden enclosure is more reflective of the new changes in tastes. For example, the main gate of the complex is topped by a library, a feature which would have been unusual in earlier periods. It also has a very ornate sebil positioned at the street corner, next to the founder's tomb. The interior of the mosque is light and decorated with tiles from the Tekfursaray kilns, which were of lesser quality than those of the earlier Iznik period. One group of tiles is painted with an illustration of the Great Mosque of Mecca, a decorative feature of which there were multiple examples in this period.

Baroque period 

During the 1740s a new Ottoman or Turkish "Baroque" style emerged in its full expression and rapidly replaced the style of the Tulip Period. This shift signaled the final end to the Classical style. The political and cultural conditions which led to the Ottoman Baroque trace their origins in part to the Tulip Period, when the Ottoman ruling class opened itself to Western influence. After the Tulip Period, Ottoman architecture openly imitated European architecture, so that architectural and decorative trends in Europe were mirrored in the Ottoman Empire at the same time or after a short delay. Changes were especially evident in the ornamentation and details of new buildings rather than in their overall forms, though new building types were eventually introduced from European influences as well. The term "Turkish Rococo", or simply "Rococo", is also used to describe the Ottoman Baroque, or parts of it, due to the similarities and influences from the French Rococo style in particular, but this terminology varies from author to author.

First Baroque monuments 
The first structures to exhibit the new Baroque style are several fountains and sebils built by elite patrons in Istanbul in 1741–1742: the fountain of Nisançı Ahmed Pasha added to the southwest wall of the Fatih Mosque cemetery, the Hacı Mehmet Emin Ağa Sebil near Dolmabahçe, and the Sa'deddin Efendi Sebil at the Karaca Ahmet Cemetery in Üsküdar. The Baroque-style Cağaloğlu Hamam in Istanbul was also built in the same year and was sponsored by Mahmud I, demonstrating that even the sultan promoted the style. The revenues of this hammam were earmarked for the Hagia Sophia (Ayasofya) Mosque, where Mahmud I built several new annexes and additions. These additions included a domed ablutions fountain in 1740–41 that is decorated with Baroque motifs but still maintains a traditional Ottoman form overall. More indicative of the new style is the imaret that Mahmud I added in the northeastern corner of Hagia Sophia's precinct in 1743. The imaret has an extravagantly Baroque gate which is carved with high-relief vegetal scrolls and a spiralling "swan-neck" pediment, flanked by marble columns with Corinthian-like capitals, and surmounted by wide eaves.

The Nuruosmaniye complex 

The most important monument heralding the new Ottoman Baroque style is the Nuruosmaniye Mosque complex, begun by Mahmud I in October 1748 and completed by his successor, Osman III (to whom it is dedicated), in December 1755. Kuban describes it as the "most important monumental construction after the Selimiye Mosque in Edirne", marking the integration of European culture into Ottoman architecture and the rejection of the Classical Ottoman style. It also marked the first time since the Sultan Ahmed I Mosque (early 17th century) that an Ottoman sultan built his own imperial mosque complex in Istanbul, thus inaugurating the return of this tradition. Historical sources attest that the architect in charge was a Christian master carpenter named Simeon or Simon.

The mosque consists of a square prayer hall surmounted by a large single dome with large pendentives. The dome is one of the largest in Istanbul, measuring 25.75 meters in diameter. From the outside, the dome sits above four huge arches (one for each side of the square) pierced with many windows that provide light to the interior. The closest precedent to this design in Classical Ottoman architecture is the Mihrimah Sultan Mosque in the Edirnekapi neighbourhood. The projecting apse which contains the mihrab is also comparable to the Selimiye Mosque in Edirne. The details and decoration of the mosque are firmly Baroque. The curving pediments above the exterior arches have concave flourishes at their edges, while the windows, doorways, and arches of the mosque have mixtilinear (i.e. combination of different curves) or round profiles instead of pointed arch profiles. Most of the entrance portals have pyramidal semi-vaults which, instead of the traditional muqarnas, are carved with many rows of acanthus-like friezes and other motifs – a composition that is neither Ottoman nor European in style. Even more unusual is the form of the mosque's courtyard, which is semielliptical instead of the traditional rectangular form. Inside, the mosque's prayer hall is flanked by symmetrical two-story galleries that extend outside the main perimeter of the hall. The corners of these galleries, on either side of the mihrab area, include space for the muezzins on one side and for the sultan's loge on the other, thus dispensing with the traditional müezzin mahfili platform in the middle of the mosque. This gallery arrangement leaves the central space unencumbered while still dissimulating the supporting piers of the dome. The mosque's stone decoration also establishes a new style of capitals that distinguishes the Ottoman Baroque: a vase or inverse bell shape, either plain or decorated, usually with small but prominent volutes at its corners, similar to Ionic capitals.

Like earlier imperial foundations, the mosque formed the center of a complex consisting of several buildings including a madrasa, an imaret, a library, a royal tomb, a sebil and fountain, and an imperial pavilion (Hünkâr Kasır), most of which are equally Baroque. The sebil and fountain that flank the western gate of the complex have curved and flamboyant forms counterbalanced by the plain walls around them, which Goodwin calls the "epitome of the baroque" style for these features. The library in the northeastern corner is distinguished by undulating curves and a roughly elliptical interior. The tomb, which houses the remains of Şehsuvar Sultan, has ornate moldings and concave cornices. At the eastern corner of the mosque is an L-shaped structured which consists of a covered ramp leading to an imperial pavilion. This kind of feature first appeared in the 17th century with the Sultan Ahmed I Mosque and was further exemplified by the Hünkâr Kasrı of the New Mosque in Eminönü. At the Nuruosmaniye, however, this pavilion is more detailed, more prominent, and more deliberately integrated into the rest of the complex. It was used as a private lounge or reception area (selamlık) for the sultan when visiting the mosque and gave him direct access to the sultan's loge inside the mosque. Because such imperial pavilions were closer to the public eye than the imperial palace, they played a role in enhancing the sultan's public presence and in staging some public ceremonies. Accordingly, the construction of imperial pavilions as part of imperial mosques aligned itself with the cultural shift taking place in the 18th century around the sultan's official displays of power, and such imperial pavilions became ever more prominent in later imperial mosques.

The reigns of Mustafa III and Abdülahmid I 
Mustafa III (r. 1757–1774), successor of Osman II and a son of Ahmed III, engaged in many building activities during his long reign. His first foundation was the Ayazma Mosque in Üsküdar in honour of his mother. Construction began in 1757-58 and finished in 1760–61. It is essentially a smaller version of the Nuruosmaniye Mosque, signalling the importance of the Nuruosmaniye as a new model to emulate. It is richly decorated with Baroque carved stonework, especially in the mihrab and minbar. While the mosque is smaller than the Nuruosmaniye, it is relatively tall for its proportions, enhancing its sense of height. This trend towards height was pursued in later mosques such as the Nusretiye Mosque. The Ayazma Mosque differs from others mainly in the unique arrangement of its front façade, which consists of a five-arched portico reached by a wide semi-circular staircase. This arrangement is similar to another contemporary mosque built in Aydın in 1756, the Cihanoğlu Mosque. The latter is also an example of Baroque elements appearing outside Istanbul in the mid century.

Mustafa III's own imperial mosque was built in the center of Istanbul and is known as the Laleli Mosque. Its construction began in 1760 and finished in 1764. Its architect was Mehmed Tahir Agha. Due to the sultan's personal wishes, its form is based on that of the Selimiye Mosque in Edirne, consisting of a main dome supported by eight piers and four corner semi-domes, thus differing significantly from the Nuruosmaniye's design. However, unlike the Selimiye Mosque, the piers are more slender and are mostly integrated directly into the walls. The mosque's courtyard is rectangular again, leaving the Nuruosmaniye's semi-elliptical courtyard as an experiment that was not repeated. The decoration is also firmly Baroque, with Ionic-like capitals, round and mixtilinear arches, a mihrab similar to the Nuruosmaniye's, and other Baroque motifs. The result is a mosque that incorporates the visual style of the Nuruosmaniye in a more restrained way and integrates it more closely with traditional Ottoman architecture.

Mustafa III also reconstructed the Fatih Mosque after the 1766 earthquake that partially destroyed it. The new Fatih Mosque was completed in 1771 and it neither reproduced the appearance of the original 15th-century building nor followed the contemporary Baroque style. It was instead built in a Classical Ottoman style modelled on the 16th-century Şehzade Mosque built by Sinan – whose design had in turn been repeated in major 17th-century mosques like the Sultan Ahmed I Mosque and the New Mosque. This probably indicates that contemporary builders saw the new Baroque style as inappropriate for the appearance of an ancient mosque embedded in the mythology of the city's 1453 conquest. At the same time, it showed that Sinan's architecture was associated with the Ottoman golden age and thus appeared as an appropriate model to imitate, despite the anachronism. By contrast, however, the nearby tomb of Mehmed II, which was rebuilt at the same time, is in a fully Baroque style.
During the reign of Abdulhamid I (r. 1774–1789) more foreign architects and artists arrived in Istanbul and the Baroque style was further consolidated. Abdulhamid I built the Beylerbeyi Mosque (1777–1778) and Emirgan Mosque (1781–82), both located in suburbs of Istanbul on the shores of the Bosphorus, though both were modified by Mahmud II (r. 1808–1839). The Beylerbeyi Mosque is notable for being oriented towards the water: while some Istanbul mosques had been built along the waterside before, the Beylerbeyi Mosque is the first one which was clearly designed to present its main façade towards the shoreline. The mosque was intended to serve as the sultan's prayer space when he was residing in one of his palaces along the Bosphorus. The prayer hall is a traditional single-domed space, but the mosque's most innovative and influential feature is the wide two-story pavilion structure that occupies its front façade, replacing the traditional courtyard or entrance portico. This is an evolution of the imperial pavilions which were attached to the side or back of earlier mosques, taking on a more residential function as a royal apartment and forming an integrated part of the mosque's appearance. This new configuration was repeated in the design of later imperial mosques.

Abdülhamid built his tomb as part of a charitable complex, the Hamidiye Complex, constructed between 1775 and 1780 in the Eminönü neighbourhood. The complex lacks a monumental congregational mosque and includes only a small mosque (mescit). Its main components were instead a madrasa and an imaret, along with the tomb itself and other minor structures. The design of the complex was notable for being completely integrated into the pre-existing urban fabric instead of being set apart in its own enclosure. Across the street from the sultan's tomb was an ornate sebil, but this was relocated near the Zeynep Sultan Mosque after 1911 when the complex was partly demolished to widen the street. The sebil is considered one of the finest examples of Baroque sebils. Its surface shows a greater degree of three-dimensional sculpting, being profusely carved with scrolls, shells, foliage, and other Baroque moldings. The decoration also demonstrates a greater Rococo tendency, such as asymmetries in the details of the motifs. These trends came to characterize Ottoman Baroque architecture in the last quarter of the 18th century.

Reign of Selim III 
Selim III (r. 1789–1807) was responsible for rebuilding the Eyüp Sultan Mosque between 1798 and 1800. This mosque is located next to the tomb of Abu Ayyub al-Ansari, an important Islamic religious site in the area of Istanbul originally built by Mehmed II. The new mosque made use of the Classical Ottoman tradition by following the octagonal baldaquin design, similar to the Sokollu Mehmed Pasha Mosque in the Azapkapı neighbourhood, but much of its decoration is in the contemporary Baroque style. Other important Baroque monuments were also built in the Eyüp neighbourhood around this time by Selim III's family. Before the reconstruction of the mosque, Mihrişah Sultan (Selim III's mother), built a charitable complex nearby in a vibrant Baroque style. Its construction took place between 1792 and 1796. It consists of a large imaret (still functioning today) and a mektep (primary school), but from the street its most visible elements are the tomb and sebil. This urban configuration is similar to the earlier Hamidiye Complex. The façade of the complex, with its vibrantly Baroque sebil and tomb, is one of the most notable exterior façade designs in Ottoman Baroque architecture. Further south, near the 16th-century Zal Mahmud Pasha Mosque, the Tomb of Şah Sultan (Selim III's sister) is another important example of a Baroque tomb from this era, built in 1800–1801.

Selim III established a new Western-inspired building type in Ottoman architecture: the barracks. The first barracks of this new tradition, the Kalyoncu Barracks in Kasımpaşa, was built to house sailors and included an accompanying mosque. It was commissioned by admiral Cezayirli Hasan Pasha in 1783–84, under Abdülhamid I. However, it was under Selim III that monumental barracks proliferated and became highly visible elements of the urban landscape. Most of these early barracks were wooden buildings that were later rebuilt in the 19th century. This new building type arose in conjunction with Selim III's reform attempts, the Nizam-I Cedid ("New Order"), which among other things created a new Western-style army. Selim III built a barracks building for his "New Artillery" regiment in Tophane, near the later site of the Nusretiye Mosque. This was destroyed by fire in 1823 and rebuilt by Mahmud II in 1824. The largest barracks of the time, the Selimiye Barracks, was built in southern Üsküdar between 1800 and 1803, but were burned down by revolting Janissaries in 1812. They were rebuilt in stone by Mahmud II between 1825 and 1828 and further expanded to their current form by Abdulmecid between 1842 and 1853.

The construction of the Selimiye Barracks was soon accompanied by the construction of the nearby Selimiye Mosque complex between 1801 and 1805. Three men served as chief court architects during this period but the main architect may have been Foti Kalfa, a Christian master carpenter. The complex included a mosque and its usual dependencies like a mektep and a hammam. More innovatively, it also included an array of factories, shops, and modern facilities such as a printing house, all arranged to form the nucleus of a new neighbourhood with a regular grid of streets. The mosque is built in high-quality stone and in a fully Baroque style. Its design illustrates the degree of influence exerted by the earlier Beylerbeyi Mosque, as it incorporates a wide imperial pavilion that stretches across its front façade. However, the design of the imperial pavilion was further refined: the two wings of the pavilion are raised on a marble arcade and there is space in the middle, between the two wings, where a staircase and entrance portico leads into the mosque, allowing for a more monumental entrance to be retained. The prayer hall is once again a single-domed space but the side galleries that are usually present inside earlier mosques have in this case been moved completely outside the prayer hall, along the building's exterior. The building is also notable for high-quality stone decoration, with the exterior marked by stone moldings along its many edges and sculpted keystones for its arches.

Palace architecture in the Baroque period 
In Topkapı Palace the Ottoman sultans and their family continued to build new rooms or remodel old ones throughout the 18th century, introducing Baroque and Rococo decoration in the process. Some examples include the Baths of the Harem section, probably renovated by Mahmud I around 1744, the Sofa Kiosk (Sofa Köşkü), restored in Rococo style by Mahmud I in 1752, the decoration of the Imperial Hall (Hünkâr Sofası), renovated by either Osman III or Abdulhamid I, the Kiosk of Osman III completed in 1754–55, and the decoration of the Imperial Council (Divan) Hall redecorated in flamboyant Baroque style by Selim III in 1792 and by Mahmud II in 1819.

As in the preceding centuries, other palaces were built around Istanbul by the sultan and his family. Previously, the traditional Ottoman palace configuration consisted of different buildings or pavilions arranged in a group, as was the case at Topkapı Palace, the Edirne Palace, the Kavak or Üsküdar Palace (at Salacak), the Tersane Palace, and others. However, at some time during the 18th century there was a transition to palaces consisting of a single block or a single large building. This trend may have been popularized by the sisters of Selim III in the late 18th century. One of his sisters, Hadice Sultan (d. 1822), had a grand shoreline palace at Defterdarburnu (near Ortaköy) on the Bopshorus. Along with the palace of Beyhan and Esma Sultan on the Golden Horn, her palace may have been one of the first Ottoman palaces to consist of a single block stretching along the shoreline. Most of these palaces have not survived to the present day. Among the rare surviving examples, Baroque decoration from this period can still be seen in the Aynalıkavak Pavilion (mentioned above), which was restored by Selim III and Mahmud II.

Beyond Istanbul the greatest palaces were built by powerful local families, but they were often built in regional styles that did not follow the trends of the Ottoman capital. The Azm Palace in Damascus, for example, was built around 1750 in a largely Damascene style. The Azm family also had a major palace in Hama. In eastern Anatolia, near present-day Doğubayazıt, the Ishak Pasha Palace is an exceptional and flamboyant piece of architecture that mixes various local traditions including Seljuk Turkish, Armenian, and Georgian. It was begun in the 17th century and generally completed by 1784.

Late Baroque monuments under Mahmud II 
The Tomb of Nakşidil Sultan (mother of Mahmud II), built in 1818 near the Fatih Mosque complex in Istanbul, is one of the finest Ottoman Baroque tombs and one of the best examples of late Baroque monuments. It also incorporates some influence from the Empire style, which was being introduced in Istanbul around this time. The tomb was designed by the Ottoman Armenian architect Krikor Balian.

The Nusretiye Mosque, Mahmud II's imperial mosque, was built between 1822 and 1826 at Tophane. Its name commemorates the "victory" which Mahmud II won by destroying the Janissaries in 1826, the year of the mosque's completion. Mahmud II also built a new artillery barracks and parade ground near the mosque at the same time, replacing the barracks of Selim III which had been destroyed by the Janissaries, thus continuing Tophane's association with the age of reforms initiated by Selim III. The mosque is the first major imperial work by Krikor Balian. It is sometimes described as belonging to the Empire style, but is considered by Godfrey Goodwin and Doğan Kuban as one of the last Baroque mosques. John Freely describes it as a mix of Baroque and Empire styles, while Ünver Rüstem describes the style as moving away from the Baroque and towards an Ottoman interpretation of Neoclassicism. Goodwin also describes it as the last in a line of imperial mosques that started with the Nuruosmaniye. Despite its relatively small size the mosque's tall proportions creates a sense of height, which may the culmination of a trend that began with the Ayazma Mosque. From the outside, the mosque's most notable details are the extreme slenderness of its minarets and its two Rococo sebils which have flamboyantly undulating surfaces.

19th-century eclecticism and other styles

Empire style 
During the reign of Mahmud II (r. 1808–1839) the Empire style, a Neoclassical style which originated in France under Napoleon, was introduced into Ottoman architecture. This marked a trend towards increasingly direct imitation of Western styles, particularly from France. The purest example of the Empire style in Istanbul is the Tomb of Mahmud II (1840), an imposing octagonal monument designed by Ohannes and Bogos Dadyan. Other examples are the Cevri Kalfa School on Divanyolu street, dated to 1819, and the tomb and library complex of Hüsrev Pasha in the Eyüp neighbourhood, dated to 1839. The upper section of the Tower of Justice or Divan Tower in Topkapı Palace was also rebuilt in its current form under Mahmud II in 1820, adopting Renaissance and Palladian elements. Empire style motifs, such as colonettes and composite capitals, continued to be widely used throughout the 19th century alongside other styles.

The Hırka-i Şerif Mosque, built between 1847 and 1851 under Abdülmecid I (r. 1839–1861), is a unique religious building in Ottoman architecture which was designed to house the Holy Mantle (Hırka-i Şerif), a relic of the Prophet Muhammad. (Another mantle and relic, the Hırka-i Saadet, is housed in Topkapı Palace.) Because of this special function, the mosque has an unusual design. It was built and decorated in a purely Empire or Neoclassical style. It is fronted by an imperial pavilion with a somber Neoclassical façade and slender minarets that look like Corinthian columns. This section leads to an octagonal mosque lit by large windows, with a mihrab and minbar fashioned of dark grey marble. The sacred relic is kept inside another smaller octagonal building directly behind the mosque.

Eclecticism 
The Tanzimat reforms began in 1839 under Abdülmecid I and sought to modernize the Ottoman Empire with Western-style reforms. In the architectural realm this period resulted in the dominance of European architects and Ottoman architects with European training. Among these, the Balians, an Ottoman Armenian family, succeeded in dominating imperial architecture for much of the century. They were joined by European architects such as the Fossati brothers, William James Smith, and Alexandre Vallaury. After the early 19th century Ottoman architecture was characterized by an eclectic architecture which mixed or borrowed from multiple styles. The Balians, for example, commonly combined Neoclassical or Beaux-arts architecture with highly eclectic decoration. As more Europeans arrived in Istanbul, the neighbourhoods of Galata and Beyoğlu (or Pera) took on very European appearances.

Eclecticism in palace architecture 

The Dolmabahçe Palace was constructed for Sultan Abdülmecit between June 13, 1843, and June 7, 1856. Construction was finished by 1853 or 1854, but the sultan did not move into the palace until 1856. It replaced the Topkapı Palace as the official imperial residence of the sultan. It was built on a site along the Bosphorus that had been previously occupied by the old Beşiktaş Palace and its gardens, which had been used and expanded by various sultans since the 17th century until its demolition to make room for the current palace. Dolmabahçe Palace was designed by Garabet Balian, though his son Nikogos was known to collaborate with him and may have designed the Ceremonial Hall and the palace gates. The palace consists mainly of a single building with monumental proportions. These characteristics represented a radical rejection of traditional Ottoman palace design. The style of the palace is fundamentally Neoclassical but is characterized by a highly eclectic decoration that mixes Baroque motifs with other styles. The monumental gates that lead to the palace grounds are especially ornate and distinguished by highly sculptural and eclectic decoration in stone, marble, and plaster. The decoration of the palace goes beyond the usual eclecticism seen in contemporary Western architecture, as it mixes multiple different styles in the same building. It lacks some consistency and unity as a result. Aside from the European-inspired design, the organization of the palace still reflected a traditional Ottoman division between the selamlık (official section), which occupies the southwestern wing of the palace, and the harem (private section), which occupies the northeastern wing. The two wings of the palace are separated by the Ceremonial Hall, a grand domed hall. The different sections of the palace are also centred around cruciform halls, another feature retained from the Ottoman tradition.

Many other palaces, residences, and pleasure pavilions were built in the 19th century, most of them in the Bosphorus suburbs of Istanbul. The small single-story Ihlamur Pavilion, built in 1849–1855, and the slightly larger two-story Küçüksu Pavilion, built in 1856, were both designed by Nikogos Balian and feature very ornate façades. They were originally used as recreational pavilions or resting areas and did not contain bedrooms, though bedrooms were later added to the Küçüksu Pavilion when it was used to house foreign dignitaries. The Mecidiye Kiosk in the Fourth Court of Topkapı Palace is another small single-story structure in a similar style, designed by Sarkis Balian and built in 1840. The Beylerbeyi Palace, along the shore of the Bosphorus, was designed by Sarkis Balian and his brother Agop Balian in a Neoclassical style with eclectic and Orientalist interior decoration. It was completed in 1864–1865 and replaced an earlier structure by Krikor Balian from the reign of Mahmud II. The palace was used as the sultan's summer residence and as a guest residence for foreign dignitaries. Like Dolmabahçe Palace, its interior is divided into selamlık and harem sections separated by a large central hall. Soon after this the Çırağan Palace was commissioned by Sultan Abdülalziz (r. 1861–1876) and completed in 1872. Nikogos or Sarkis Balian was probably responsible for the design. It has a severe Neoclassical appearance except for the decoration, which is Orientalist and includes carved openwork in the windows. The palace was destroyed by fire in 1910, leaving only the seaside façade standing which was later integrated into a hotel in 1987.

One of the last major Ottoman imperial creations was the Yıldız Palace, a sprawling complex of buildings set amidst a large wooded park (Yıldız Park) on a hillside overlooking the Bosphorus. The area had been a private garden of the sultans since the 17th century and was known as the Çırağan garden during the Tulip Period. Selim III, Mahmud II, Abdülmecid and Abdülaziz each erected various pavilions here, but it was Abdülhamid II (r. 1876–1909) who transformed it into an imperial palace, residence, and seat of government. After the massive single-block palace buildings like Dolmabahçe, the Yildiz Palace returned to the older tradition of creating many different structures with no overarching site plan. Unlike Topkapı Palace though, the structures are not linked together around courtyards and they instead resemble a kind of rural mountain village. Moreover, the palace and inner gardens were separated from the adjacent wooded park which was open to the public. One part of the palace complex formed its own private harem section. The most imposing structure in the center of the palace is the Büyük Mabeyn Köşk erected by Abdülaziz and designed by Agop and Sarkis Balian. It has a traditional divanhane layout typical of earlier Ottoman pavilions and a Neoclassical design with Orientalist decoration similar to the contemporary Çırağan Palace. The many subsequent buildings built under Abdülhamid II are less monumental and many of them were designed by Raimond D'Aronco in an Art Nouveau style. One of the largest and most interesting is the Şale or Chalet Pavilion, so-called because it was built to resemble a Swiss mountain chalet in the Alps. The palace complex also included a theatre, a greenhouse, stables, and an official mosque, the Hamidiye Mosque. Several other pavilions stand in the park outside the private palace enclosure such as the Malta Kiosk and the Çadır Kiosk, both designed by the Balians under Sultan Abdülaziz. The mosque, designed by Sarkis Balian for Abdülhamid II and dated to 1886, has no resemblance at all to the traditional form of Ottoman mosques and looks more like a church. It is decorated with neo-Gothic and Orientalist details, some of which recall the decoration of the earlier Çırağan Palace and the Pertevniyal Valide Mosque (discussed below).

Eclecticism in mosque architecture 
After the Nusretiye Mosque, one of the earliest mosques designed by the Balian family is the Küçuk Mecidiye Mosque in Istanbul, near Yıldız, which was built in 1848. At the same time as the Dolmabahçe Palace was being built, Garabet and Nikogos Balian also built the nearby Dolmabahçe Mosque, commissioned by Bezmi'alem Valide Sultan in 1853 but finished after her death by her son Abdülmecit in 1855. The mosque is Neoclassical in style and distinguished by its minarets which are shaped like Corinthian columns up to their balcony levels. It is a single-domed building fronted by a large and imposing imperial pavilion. The mosque's upper windows are arranged in a semi-circular wheel-like design under the arches that support the dome. The Ortaköy Mosque (or Büyük Mecidiye Mosque), located further northeast on a small promontory along the Bosphorus shore, has a very similar design that is considered more successful. The mosque was once again designed by Garabet Balian and his son Nikogos and was built between 1854 and 1856 – although Goodwin and Kuban cite the year of construction as 1853. The Balians likely worked as a team in order to produce so many works in such a short period. The mosque has a Baroque appearance in its use of strong curves but it features an eclectic mix of styles, except for the imperial pavilion in front which is entirely Neoclassical. The mosque is covered in highly ornate and sculptural details that recall the style of the Ceremonial Hall and gates of the Dolmabahçe Palace.

The Pertevniyal Valide Mosque in Istanbul was built in the Aksaray neighbourhood of Istanbul in 1871 in honour of Abdülaziz's mother. It is usually attributed to the Italian architect Montani Efendi or to Agop Balian, although it's possible that both were responsible for different aspects of the design. The mosque is an intense mix of styles including Ottoman, Gothic, and Empire styles. One notable change from previous mosques is the decrease in the imperial pavilion's size relative to the mosque, reversing the previous trend of the 18th-19th centuries. The use of Ottoman revival features in this mosque is also an indication that the foundations for a future Ottoman revivalist movement were already being laid at this time. Another eclectic-style mosque of the same period is the Aziziye Mosque in Konya, built in 1872. This is the only imperial mosque built in Anatolia during the late Ottoman period.

New churches and synagogues 

The Tanzimat reforms also granted Christians and Jews the right to freely build new centers of worship, which resulted in the significant construction, renovation, and expansion of churches and synagogues. Most of these new constructions followed the same eclecticism that prevailed in the rest of Ottoman architecture of the 19th century. Among the notable examples of Greek Orthodox churches is the Hagia Triada Church, a prominent building near Taksim Square in Beyoğlu which was built by the architect Vasilaki Ioannidi in 1880. Another is the Hagia Kyriaki Church in the Kumkapı neighbourhood, which was built in 1895 by local architects for the Karaman Greek community. Hagia Kyriaki is one of the few modern mosques in Istanbul built in the Byzantine tradition, using a central-domed layout. The Stefan Sveti Church (or Church of St. Stephen of the Bulgars) is a Bulgarian Orthodox church built between 1895 and 1898 in an eclectic style, located in the Balat neighbourhood. It was the first steel building in Istanbul, designed by architect Hovsep Aznavu. Its pieces were fabricated abroad and then assembled in Istanbul. Among examples of 19th-century Armenian churches, the Surp Asdvadzadzin Church in Beşiktaş (not to be confused with the Surp Asdvadzadzin Patriarchal Church) was built in 1838 by Garabet Balian. Its style deviated from traditional Armenian architecture in Istanbul and reflected instead the Neoclassical or Empire style that the Balians used during the reign of Mahmud II, including an Ottoman-style dome. The Surp Asdvadzadzin Church in Gaziantep (later converted to the Kurtuluş Mosque) was built between 1878 and 1893 in an eclectic style that references European styles as well as local influences such as ablaq masonry, demonstrating that eclecticism was present far outside Istanbul. Later on, the largest and most famous Catholic church in Istanbul, the Church of St. Anthony in Beyoğlu, was built between 1906 and 1912 in a neo-Gothic style by architect Giulio Mongeri.

In addition to places of worship, new educational institutions and colleges associated with churches were built. In Fener, near the Greek Orthodox Patriarchal Church, the Phanar Greek Orthodox College (or Megalio Scholio in Greek) was built in 1881 to house a much older Greek educational institution. The structure is one of the most dominating features of the skyline in this area. The architect Konstantinos Dimandis most likely designed it with a neo-Byzantine style in mind.

The synagogues of Istanbul's longstanding Jewish community were comparatively unpretentious structures and few ancient synagogues have survived earthquakes and fires over the centuries. One of the oldest, the Ahrida Synagogue in Balat, was rebuilt in its current form in 1709 and reflects the architecture of the Tulip Period, though it was restored and refurbished again in the 19th century. Some notable 19th-century examples include the Italian Synagogue, built in the 1880s with a neo-Gothic façade, and the Ashkenazi Synagogue, inaugurated in 1900 with a European-style façade.

New building types 
Among the new types of monuments introduced to Ottoman architecture during this era, clock towers rose to prominence over the 19th century. One of the earliest towers, and the earliest Ottoman clock tower featuring a bell, was the clock tower built by Izzet Mehmed Pasha in Safranbolu in 1798. Sometime between 1835 and 1839 Mahmud II erected the oldest clock tower in Istanbul, the Tophane Clock Tower near the Nusretiye Mosque, which was rebuilt in more monumental form by Abdülmecit in 1848 or 1849. The largest and most impressive clock tower in Istanbul is the Dolmabahçe Clock Tower (near Dolmabahçe Palace), which was built by Abdülhamid II in 1890–1894. It mixes late Baroque decoration with the Neoclassical and eclectic style of the 19th century. Both these towers, along with the Yıldız Clock Tower (1890), Bursa Clock Tower (rebuilt in 1905), and many others, are designed with a multi-level appearance. Other towers across the empire varied considerably in style. The Adana Clock Tower (1882), by contrast with the Istanbul examples, is a severe brick structure resembling the medieval Italian towers of San Gimignano. Other towers were built in a form resembling a minaret, such as the Çorum Clock Tower (1896). In 1901 Sultan Abdülhamid II (r. 1876–1909) encouraged the construction of clock towers across the empire for the celebration of the 25th anniversary of his accession to the throne. The Konak Clock Tower in Izmir is one example built that year. Eventually every sizeable Ottoman town was equipped with a clock tower.

In the Beyoğlu district of Istanbul, Parisian-style shopping arcades appeared in the 19th century. Some arcades consisted of a small courtyard filled with shops and surrounded by buildings, as with the example of the Hazzopulo Pasajı, begun in 1850 and completed in 1871. Others were simply built as a passage or alley (pasaj in Turkish) lined with shops. They were commonly built in a Neoclassical style with some European Baroque-style decoration, and were sometimes covered with a glass roof. One of the best-known examples is the Çiçek Pasajı ("Flower Passage") built in 1876 as part of a building called the Cité de Pera, which contained shops on the ground floor and luxury apartments above. Other well-known examples include the Avrupa Pasajı (1874), the Atlas Pasajı (1877), the Halep (Aleppo) Pasajı (1880–1885), and the Suriye Pasajı (1908). Other commercial building types that appeared in the late 19th century included hotels, such as the Londra Hotel (1891) and Pera Palace Hotel designed by Alexandre Vallaury (1895), and banks, such as the Ottoman Bank building also designed by Vallaury (1890). These new buildings were also concentrated in the Beyoğlu district and many were again designed in a Neoclassical style, though eclecticism remained apparent in the details or interior decoration.

The construction of railway stations was a feature of Ottoman modernisation reflecting the new infrastructure changes within the empire. The most famous example is the Sirkeci Railway Station, built in 1888–1890 as the terminus of the Orient Express. It was designed in an Orientalist style by German architect August Jasmund (also spelled "Jachmund"). The other major railway station of the era was Haydarpaşa Station, first built in 1872 when the railway to Baghdad was completed. The original building was a mix of Neoclassical, Baroque, and Orientalist styles. It was rebuilt in its current form in 1906–1908 by German architects Otto Ritter and Helmet Cuno in a German neo-Renaissance style. Both Sirkeci and Haydarpaşa stations were designed with a U-shaped layout with platforms in the center.

Later trends: Orientalism and Art Nouveau 
A local interpretation of Orientalist fashion steadily arose in the late 19th century, initially used by European architects such as Vallaury. This trend combined "neo-Ottoman" motifs with other motifs from wider Islamic architecture. The Sirkeci Railway Station (1888–1890), for example, was built in an Orientalist style, but its appearance makes more use of non-Ottoman Islamic architecture styles like Mamluk architecture than it does of Ottoman features. The iconic clock tower of Izmir (1901) was also built in a highly Orientalist style. Alexandre Vallaury, in collaboration with Raimondo D'Aronco, designed the neo-Ottoman-style Imperial School of Medicine in Üsküdar, built between 1893 and 1903. Another building with neo-Ottoman motifs by Vallaury is the Office of Public Debts (now serving as the Istanbul Erkek Lisesi), erected in Istanbul in 1897. The orientalist and Ottoman revivalist trends of this period, of which Vallaury was a major figure, eventually led to the First National Architecture movement which, alongside Art Nouveau, dominated architecture in the last years of the Ottoman Empire.

The eclecticism and European imports of the 19th century eventually led to the introduction of Art Nouveau, especially after the arrival of Raimondo D'Aronco in the late 19th century. D'Aronco came at the invitation of Sultan Abdülhamid II and served as chief court architect between 1896 and 1909. Istanbul became a new center of Art Nouveau and a local flavour of the style developed. The new style was most prevalent in the new apartment buildings being built in Istanbul at the time. The Camondo Stairs in Galata, donated to the city by a local Jewish family in 1860, are an early Art Nouveau example. The Botter Apartment building (1900–1901) on Istiklal Street and the Tomb of Sheikh Zafir in Yıldız (1905–1906) are among the most notable examples designed by D'Aronco, in addition to some of his buildings in the Yıldız Palace. Art Nouveau decoration was applied to a wide variety of materials including stone, wood, stucco, and iron. Reflecting the continued eclecticism of the 19th century, they were also mixed with other styles such as neo-Baroque, neo-Ottoman, and Empire, such that Art Nouveau buildings were not always distinguishable from other genres. For example, the Hamidiye Fountain (1896–1901), originally erected in Tophane but later moved to Maçka Park, is a more eclectic work designed by D'Aronco.

First National Architectural Movement (early 20th century) 

The final period of architecture in the Ottoman Empire, developed after 1900 and in particular put into effect after the Young Turks took power in 1908–1909, is what was then called the "National Architectural Renaissance" and which gave rise to the style since referred to as the First national architectural movement of Turkish architecture. The approach in this period was an Ottoman Revival style, a reaction to influences in the previous 200 years that had come to be considered "foreign," such as Baroque and Neoclassical architecture, and was intended to promote Ottoman patriotism and self-identity. This was an entirely new style of architecture, related to earlier Ottoman architecture in rather the same manner was other roughly contemporaneous revivalist architectures related to their stylistic inspirations. New government-run institutions that trained architects and engineers, established in the late 19th century and further centralized under the young Turks, became instrumental in disseminating this "national style".

The Ottoman Revival architecture of this period was based on modern construction techniques and materials such as reinforced concrete, iron, steel, and often glass roofs, and in many cases used what was essentially a Beaux-Arts structure with outward stylistic motifs associated with the original architecture from which it was inspired. The main difference between this style and the previous orientalist/revivalist trends led by European architects was a more conscious study of past Ottoman architecture and pre-Ottoman Turkish architecture in Anatolia in the search of a more uniform "Turkish" style. The new style focused outwardly on forms and motifs seen to be traditionally "Ottoman" such as pointed arches, ornate tile decoration, wide roof overhangs with supporting brackets, domes over towers or corners, etc. It also adapted these traditional elements for more modern building types such as railway stations, government offices, and other public buildings.

The emergence of this movement also brought Turkish architects back to the forefront of Ottoman architecture. The most important representatives of this architectural period are Vedat Tek (or Vedat Bey) and Ahmed Kemaleddin Bey. One of the earliest and most important examples is the Istanbul Grand Post Office in Sirkeci, completed in 1909 and designed by Vedat Tek. The most important example of Kemaleddin Bey's works is the Vakıf Han, also in Sirkeci, begun in 1914. Both of these buildings, which have grand facades with corner domes, are among the finest landmarks of the First National Architecture Movement. The style was also employed for mosques, of which the traditional-looking Bebek Mosque (1913) by Kemaleddin Bey is among the best examples. Other important extant examples include the Istanbul ferryboat terminals built between 1913 and 1917, such as the Besiktas terminal by Ali Talat Bey (1913), the Haydarpaşa ferry terminal by Vedat Tek (1913), the Buyukada terminal by Mihran Azaryan (1915). Another example is the Sultanahmet Jail (1916–1917), now a Four Seasons Hotel. In Ankara, the earliest building in the style is the building that now houses the War of Independence Museum and served as the first house of the Turkish Republic's National Assembly in 1920. It was built in 1917 by Ismail Hasif Bey as the local headquarters for the Young Turks' Committee of Union and Progress.

Originally, this style was meant to promote the patriotism and identity of the historically multi-ethnic Ottoman Empire, but by the end of World War I and the creation of the Turkish Republic, it was adopted by the republican Turkish nationalists to promote a new Turkish sense of patriotism. In this role, it continued into, and influenced the later architecture of the Republic of Turkey.

Tile decoration

Early Ottoman tilework 

Some of the earliest known tile decoration in Ottoman architecture is found in the Green Mosque in Iznik, whose minaret incorporates glazed tiles forming patterns in the brickwork (although the current tiles are modern restorations). This technique was inherited from the earlier Seljuk period. Glazed tile decoration in the cuerda seca technique was used in other early Ottoman monuments, particularly in the Green Mosque and the associated Green Tomb in Bursa. The tiles of the Green Mosque complex generally have a deep green ground mixed with combinations of blue, white, and yellow forming arabesque motifs. A large portion of the tiles are cut into hexagonal and triangular shapes that were then fitted together to form murals. Some of the tiles are further enhanced with arabesque motifs applied in gilt gold glazing over these colours. Inscriptions in the mosque record that the decoration was completed in 1424 by Nakkaş Ali, a craftsman native to Bursa who had been transported to Samarkand by Timur after the Ottoman defeat at the Battle of Ankara in 1402. In Samarkand, he was exposed to Timurid architecture and decoration and brought this artistic experience back with him later. Other inscriptions record the tilemakers as being "Masters of Tabriz", suggesting that craftsmen of Iranian origin were involved. Tabriz was historically a major center of ceramic art in the Islamic world, and its artists appear to have emigrated and worked in many regions from Central Asia to Egypt. The artistic style of these tiles – and of other Ottoman art – was influenced by an "International Timurid" taste that emerged from the intense artistic patronage of the Timurids, who controlled a large empire across the region. Doğan Kuban argues that the decoration of the Green Mosque complex was more generally a product of collaboration between craftsmen of different regions, as this was the practice in Anatolian Islamic art and architecture during the preceding centuries.
The same kind of tilework is found in the mihrab of the Murad II Mosque in Edirne, completed in 1435. However, this mosque also contains the first examples of a new technique and style of tiles with underglaze blue on a white background, with touches of turquoise. This technique is found on the tiles that cover the muqarnas hood of the mihrab and in the mural of hexagonal tiles along the lower walls of the prayer hall. The motifs on these tiles include lotuses and camellia-like flowers on spiral stems. These chinoiserie-like motifs, along with the focus on blue and white colours, most likely reflect an influence from contemporary Chinese porcelain – although the evidence for Chinese porcelain reaching Edirne at this time is unclear. Tilework panels with similar techniques and motifs are found in the courtyard of the Üç Şerefeli Mosque, another building commissioned by Murad II in Edirne, completed in 1437.

The evidence from this tilework in Bursa and Edirne indicates the existence of a group or a school of craftsmen, the "Masters of Tabriz", who worked for imperial workshops in the first half of the 15th century and were familiar with both cuerda seca and underglaze techniques. As the Ottoman imperial court moved from Bursa to Edirne, they too moved with it. However, their work does not clearly appear anywhere after this period. Later on, the Tiled Kiosk in Istanbul, completed in 1472 for Mehmed II's New Palace (Topkapı Palace), is notably decorated with Iranian-inspired banna'i tilework. The builders were likely of Iranian origin, as historical documents indicate the presence of tilecutters from Khorasan, but not much is known about them. Another unique example of tile decoration in Istanbul around the same period is found on the Tomb of Mahmud Pasha, built in 1473 as part of the Mahmud Pasha Mosque complex. Its exterior is covered in a mosaic of turquoise and indigo tiles inset into the sandstone walls to form geometric star patterns. The work still reflects a traditional style of Anatolian or Persian tile decoration similar to older Timurid examples.

Another stage in Ottoman tiles is evident in the surviving tiles of the Fatih Mosque (1463–70) and in the Selim I Mosque (1520–22). In these mosques the windows are topped by lunettes filled with cuerda seca tiles with motifs in green, turquoise, cobalt blue, and yellow. Chinese motifs such as dragons and clouds also appear for the first time on similar tiles in Selim I's tomb, built behind his mosque in 1523. A more extravagant example of this type of tilework can be found inside the tomb of Şehzade Mehmed in the cemetery of the Şehzade Mosque (1548). Further examples can be found in a few religious structures designed by Sinan in this period, such as the Haseki Hürrem Complex (1539). The latest example of it is in the Kara Ahmet Pasha Mosque (1555), once again in the lunettes above the windows of the courtyard. Many scholars traditionally attribute these Ottoman tiles to craftsmen that Selim I brought back from Tabriz after his victory at the Battle of Chaldiran. Doğan Kuban argues that this assumption is unnecessary if one considers the artistic continuity between these tiles and earlier Ottoman tiles as well as the fact that the Ottoman state had always employed craftsmen from different parts of the Islamic world. John Carswell, a professor of Islamic art, states that the tiles are the work of an independent imperial workshop based in Istanbul that worked from Iranian traditions. Godfrey Goodwin suggests that the style of tiles does not correspond to either the old "Masters of Tabriz" school or to an Iranian workshop, and therefore may represent an early phase of tilework from Iznik; an "early Iznik" style.  

An important case of Ottoman tile decoration outside the imperial capitals around this time was the refurbishment of the Dome of the Rock in Jerusalem ordered by Sultan Suleiman. During the refurbishment, the exterior of the building was covered in tilework which replaced the older Umayyad mosaic decoration. Inscriptions in the tiles give the date 1545–46, but work probably continued until the end of Suleiman's reign (1566). The name of one of the craftsmen is recorded as Abdallah of Tabriz. The tilework includes many different styles and techniques, including cuerda seca tiles, colourful underglaze tiles, and mosaic blue-and-white tilework. The tiles seem to have been fabricated locally rather than at centers like Iznik, despite the absence of a sophisticated ceramic production center in the region. This project is also notable as one of the few cases of extensive tile decoration applied to the exterior of a building in Ottoman architecture. This major restoration work in Jerusalem may have also played a role in Ottoman patrons developing a taste for tiles, such as those made in Iznik (which was closer to the capital).

Classical Iznik tiles 

The city of Iznik had been a center of pottery production under the Ottomans since the 15th century, but until the mid-16th century it was mainly concerned with producing pottery vessels. There is little evidence of large-scale tile manufacture in Iznik before this time. In the late 15th century, in the 1470s or 1480s, the Iznik industry had grown in prominence and patronage and began producing a new "blue-and-white" fritware which adapted and incorporated Chinese motifs in its decoration. Some of these blue-and-white ceramics appear in tile form in the decoration in the Hafsa Hatun Mosque (1522) in Manisa and in the Çoban Mustafa Pasha Mosque (1523) in Gebze. The Hadim Ibrahim Pasha Mosque (1551) also contains panels of well-executed tiles featuring calligraphic and floral decoration in cobalt blue, white, olive green, turquoise, and pale manganese purple. The most extraordinary tile panels from this period are a series of panels on the exterior of Circumcision Pavilion (Sünnet Odası) in Topkapı Palace. The tiles in this composition have been dated to various periods within the 16th century and some were probably moved here during a restoration of the pavilion in the first half of the 17th century. Nonetheless, at least some of the tiles are believed to date from the 1520s and feature large floral motifs in blue, white, and turquoise. Both the Topkapı tiles and the mosque tiles from this early-16th-century period are traditionally attributed to Iznik, but they may have been produced in Istanbul itself in ceramic workshops located at Tekfursaray. Even if they come from Tekfursaray, their style is related to the style of ceramics being made in Iznik around the same time. This includes the saz style: a motif in which a variety of flowers are attached to gracefully curving stems with serrated leaves. This continued to reflect earlier influences of the "International Timurid" style, but it also demonstrates the development of an increasingly distinct Ottoman artistic style at this time.

Ceramic art from Iznik reached its apogee in the second half of the 16th century, particularly with the advent of the "tomato red" colour in its compositions. At the same time, Iznik grew into its role as a major center of tile production rather than just dishware. Rather than merely highlighting certain architectural features (e.g. windows) with tile panels, large-scale murals of tilework became more common. For this purpose, square tiles were also now preferred over the hexagonal tiles of the older Iranian tradition. This was around the same time that Mimar Sinan, chief court architect, was also reaching the pinnacle of his career. Iznik ceramics and classical Ottoman architecture thus reached their greatest heights of achievement around the same time, during the reign of Suleiman and his immediate successors. Sinan generally used tile decoration in a fairly restrained manner and seems to have preferred focusing on the architecture as a whole rather than on overwhelming decoration. For example, Sinan's most celebrated works, the Süleymaniye Mosque (1550–57) and the Selimiye Mosque (1568-1574), feature tile decoration restricted to certain areas. Even the Sokollu Mehmed Pasha Mosque (1568-1572), which is known for its extensive high-quality tile decoration, still concentrates and focuses this decoration onto the wall surrounding the mihrab instead of on the whole mosque interior. The major exception to this is the Rüstem Pasha Mosque (1561–62), whose interior and outer portico are extensively covered in Iznik tiles. The mosque is even regarded as a "museum" of Iznik tiles from this period. Judging by comparisons with Sinan's other works, the exceptional use of tilework in this mosque may have been due to a specific request by the wealthy patron, Rüstem Pasha, rather than a voluntary decision by Sinan himself. There is no evidence that Sinan was closely involved in the production of tiles and it's likely that he merely decided where tile decoration would be placed and made sure that the craftsmen were capable. Doğan Kuban also argues that while the vivid tiles inside the mihrab of the Rüstem Pasha Mosque could have symbolized an image of Paradise, tile decoration in Ottoman mosques did not generally have deeper symbolic meanings. Moroever, unlike Byzantine mosaics, tiles were also not well-suited to curved surfaces and as a result they were not used to decorate domes, which were decorated with painted motifs instead.

The tilework in Rüstem Pasha Mosque also marks the beginning of the artistic peak of Iznik tile art from the 1560s onward. Blue colours predominate, but the important "tomato red" colour began to make an appearance. The repertoire of motifs includes tulips, hyacinths, carnations, roses, pomegranates, artichoke leaves, narcissus, and Chinese "cloud" motifs. Around 1560 the colour palette of Iznik tiles also shifted slightly. With the introduction of tomato red, which was perfected in the following years, some colours like turquoise and manganese purple stopped appearing, while a new shade of green also appeared. This shift is partly evident in the Rüstem Pasha Mosque and especially in the extensive tilework in the tomb of Haseki Hürrem (1558) and the tomb of Suleiman (1566), both located behind the Süleymaniye Mosque. The highest artistic form of Iznik tiles was achieved soon after this during the reign of Selim II, who succeeded his father Suleiman, and continued until the end of the century. Some of the most exceptional tilework examples from this period can be found in the Sokullu Mehmed Pasha Mosque, the Piyale Pasha Mosque (1574), the tomb of Selim II (1576), the small Takkeci İbrahim Ağa Mosque (1592), the tomb of Murad III (1595), and in some parts of the Topkapı Palace. The tilework panels in the Chamber of Murad III (1578) in Topkapı Palace and in the mihrab area of the Atik Valide Mosque (1583) in Üsküdar also show a trend of using colours in more abstract ways, such as the adding of red spots on flower petals of different colours, which is a detail particular to Ottoman art. As noted by Arthur Lane in his seminal study of Iznik tiles published in 1957, the effect of Iznik tilework, when successfully employed in Ottoman domed interiors, results in a feeling of lightness and harmony, where the intricate details of the tiles themselves do not overwhelm the onlooker. Tile decoration in the provinces was typically of lesser quality to that found in the main imperial centers of patronage. However some wealthy local patrons probably imported tiles from Istanbul, which explains the high-quality tilework in some distant monuments such as the Behram Pasha Mosque (1572–73) in Diyarbakir.

In the early 17th century, some features of 16th-century Iznik tiles began to fade, such as the use of embossed tomato red. At the same time, some motifs became more rigidly geometric and stylized. The enormous Sultan Ahmed Mosque (or "Blue Mosque"), begun in 1609 and inaugurated in 1617, contains the richest collection of tilework of any Ottoman mosque. According to official Ottoman documents it contained as many as 20,000 tiles. The dominant colours are blue and green, while the motifs are typical of the 17th century: tulips, carnations, cypresses, roses, vines, flower vases, and Chinese cloud motifs. The best tiles in the mosque, located on the back wall on the balcony level, were originally made for the Topkapı Palace in the late 16th century and were reused here. The massive undertaking of decorating such a large building strained the tile industry in Iznik and some of the tilework is repetitive and inconsistent in its quality. The much smaller Çinili ("Tiled") Mosque (1640) in Üsküdar is also covered in tilework on the inside. The most harmonious examples of tile decoration in 17th-century Ottoman architecture are the Yerevan Kiosk and Baghdad Kiosk in Topkapı Palace, built in 1635 and 1639, respectively. Both their exterior and interior walls are covered in tiles. Some of the tiles are cuerda seca tiles of a much earlier period, reused from elsewhere, but most are blue-and-white tiles that imitate early 16th-century Iznik work.

While the craftsmen at Iznik were still capable of producing rich and colourful tiles throughout the 17th century, there was an overall decline in quality. This was a result of a decline in imperial commissions, as fewer major building projects were sponsored by ruling elites during this period. The Celali revolts in the early 17th century also had a significant impact, as Evliya Çelebi records that the number of tile workshops in Iznik during this time dropped from 900 to only 9. Some of the production continued in the city of Kütahya instead of Iznik. Kütahya, unlike Iznik, had not become solely reliant on imperial commissions and as a result it weathered the changes more successfully. Many of its artisans were Armenians who continued to produce tiles for churches and other buildings.

Tile manufacture declined further in the second half of the century. Nonetheless, the interior of the "New Mosque" or Yeni Cami in the Eminönü neighbourhood, completed in 1663, is a late example of lavish Iznik tile decoration in an imperial mosque. The finest tiles in the complex are reserved for the sultan's private gallery and lounge (the Hünkâr Kasrı). By this period, blue and turquoise colours increasingly predominated, and many commissioned works limited their patterns to single tiles instead of creating larger patterns across multiple tiles. Tiles like this were imported in significant quantities to Egypt around this time, as can be seen in the Aqsunqur Mosque (otherwise known as the "Blue Mosque") in Cairo, which was renovated in 1652 by Ibrahim Agha, a local Janissary commander.

Tekfursaray and Kütahya tiles (18th century) 

Tile production in Iznik came to an end in the 18th century. Ahmet III and his grand vizier attempted to revive the tile industry by establishing a new workshop between 1719 and 1724 at Tekfursaray in Istanbul, where a previous workshop had existed in the early 16th century. Production continued here for a while but the tiles from this period are not comparable to earlier Iznik tiles. Pottery production also continued and even increased at Kütahya, where new styles developed alongside imitations of older classical Ottoman designs. The colours of tiles in this period were mostly turquoise and dark cobalt blue, while a brownish-red, yellow, and a deep green also appearing. The background was often discoloured, colours often ran together slightly, and the patterns were again typically limited to single tiles. The earliest recorded Tekfursaray tiles are those made in 1724–1725 for the mihrab of the older Cezeri Kasım Pasha Mosque (1515) in Eyüp, Istanbul. Tekfursaray tiles are also found in the Hekimoğlu Ali Pasha Mosque (1734), on the Ahmed III Fountain (1729) near Hagia Sophia, and in some of the rooms and corridors of the Harem section in Topkapı Palace. Kütahya tiles are present in Istanbul in the Yeni Valide Mosque in Üsküdar (1708–1711), the Beylerbeyi Mosque (1777–1778), and arts of Topkapı Palace, and well as in mosques in other cities like Konya and Antalya.

The Kütahya and Tekfursary kilns notably produced a number of tiles and groups of tiles that were painted with illustrations of the Great Mosque of Mecca. These appear in multiple buildings the 18th century, but some examples of this appeared even earlier in Iznik tiles from the late 17th century. Earlier examples show the Kaaba and the surrounding colonnades of the mosque in a more abstract style. Later examples in the 18th century, influenced by European art, employ perspective in depicting the mosque and they sometimes depict the entire city of Mecca. Depictions of Medina and the Prophet's Mosque also appear in other specimens of the time. Examples of these pictorial tile paintings can be seen in the collections of several museums as well as inside some mosques (e.g. the Hekimoğlu Ali Pasha Mosque) and in several rooms at Topkapı Palace, such as the tiles adorning the mihrab of the prayer room of the Black Eunuchs.

After the Patrona Halil rebellion in 1730, which deposed Ahmet III and executed his grand vizier, the Tekfursaray kilns were left without a patron and quickly ceased to function. The shortage of quality tiles in the 18th century also caused Iznik tiles from older buildings to be reused and moved to new ones on multiple occasions. For example, when repairs were being done at Topkapı Palace in 1738 old tiles had to be removed from the Edirne Palace and shipped to Istanbul instead. Ultimately, tilework decoration in Ottoman architecture lost its significance during the 18th century. Kütahya nonetheless did continue to produce decorative tiles up to the 19th century, though the quality deteriorated in the late 18th century. Some of the potters in the city were Armenian Christians and some of the tiles were commissioned for Armenian churches. Christian tile decoration of this period often depicted saints, angels, the Virgin Mary, and biblical scenes. Examples can be found at the Krikor Lusaroviç Church in Tophane, Istanbul, and the Surp Astvazazin Church in Ankara, among others. Some of the tiles were exported further abroad and examples of them have been found in Jerusalem, Cairo, and Venice. A moderately successful effort to revive Ottoman tile production occurred under Abdülhamid II in the late 19th and early 20th centuries, partly under the influence of the First National Architectural Movement. This period saw tiles produced for several new mosques, schools, and government buildings. These workshops eventually closed down after the First World War.

Paradise garden

"The semblance of Paradise (cennet) promised the pious and devout [is that of a garden] with streams of water that will not go rank, and rivers of milk whose taste will not undergo a change, and rivers of wine delectable to drinkers, and streams of purified honey, and fruits of every kind in them, and forgiveness from their lord".(47:15)

According to the Qur'an, paradise is described as a place, a final destination. Basically the eternal life, that is filled with "spiritual and physical" happiness. Earth gardens in the Ottoman period were highly impacted by paradise, therefore connected with the arts and spaces of everyday life, having many descriptions relating to the Qur'an. Hence, paradise gardens, or "Earthly Paradise", are abstract perceptions of heaven, as a result must symbolize a serene place that shows "eternity and peace".

Nature became a method for decorative patterns in architectural details and urban structure. Everything was inspired by nature and became included with nature. From the ceilings of the mosques and the walls of the palaces, kiosks and summer palaces (pavilions), which were all embellished with tiles, frescoes and hand-carved ornaments, to the kaftans, the yashmaks and so much more. Clearly, paradise's nature was everywhere; in many spaces of daily life.

Without a doubt, the general layout of the gardens did reflect many descriptions in the Qur'an, yet one of the great strengths of early Islam, was that Muslims looked at different sources and used useful ideas and techniques from diverse sources, particularly Byzantium (the Eastern Roman Empire). Garden pavilions often took the form of a square or centrally planned free-standing structures open on all sides, designed specifically to enjoy the sight, scent and music of the environment. Some of the forms of the gardens were based for instance on the Hagia Sophia's atrium, which has cypresses around a central fountain, and the plantings in the mosques were given a "specifically Muslim theological interpretation". The mosques expanded its functions and services, by adding hospitals, madars, libraries, etc., and therefore gardens helped organize the elements for all the various buildings.

In Islamic cities, such as the Ottoman cities, where the mosques were considered as the "focal" point, it was common for mosques to have adjacent gardens. Therefore, mosque structures were based somewhat to relate to the gardens. For example, the Süleymaniye Mosque had windows in the qibla wall to create continuity with the garden outside. The mihrab had stained glass windows and Iznik tiles that suggest a gate into paradise. The windows looking outwards to the garden to create the effect in which flowers from the garden act as if it would "perfume the minds of the congregation as if they have entered heaven." Also, Rüstem Pasha mosque was known for its usage of Izink tiles, where the decoration design provides a showcase for the Iznik tile industry. The inscriptions on pendentives suggest that the soul of the devout is certain to reside in paradise. The main inscriptions in these mosques were of water and ponds, kiosks, fruits such as pomegranates, apples, pears, grapes, etc. Also wine, dance, music, serving women and boys, all which turn the entertainment vision into a "paradise on earth".

Apart from the mosques, cities were also developed into "extremely friendly cities". They had grape arbors in shaded narrow streets, corners with trees and gardens. Trees were thought to be the balancing element of architecture that provided harmony between nature and buildings. For that reason, Ottoman cities "look as though they are extensions of the piece of land where they were built". Moreover, the usage of timber in the buildings add to the connection with nature. A Turkish architect and city planner, Turgut Cansever, described the Ottoman cities as the "Ottoman paradises‟ and said that the Islamic characteristics are best represented by the Ottoman cities: "The ones who build the paradise where there exist no conflicts but all the beauties, tried to rise and open the Gates of paradise by accomplishing the task of beautifying the world." The intimate relationship of architecture with nature attracted the element of trees and water. With its exclusively natural "synthesis structure", the Ottoman city was green, as many travelers have described it. Also, water was a fundamental element, as was the cypress tree. Antoine Galland wrote, "Turkish gardens were conduits and little channels which took water everywhere and from which water was extracted under pressure." However, there is no evidence in the first four centuries of Islam that gardens were consciously designed with four quadrants and four water channels in order to represent paradise as the Qur'an described it.

See also

 Ottoman architecture in Egypt
 Ottoman palaces in Istanbul
 Ajyad Fortress
 Mosques commissioned by the Ottoman dynasty
 List of clock towers in Turkey
 List of Ottoman domes
 Architecture of Turkey

References

Bibliography

Further reading

External links
 Turkish Architecture
 A look at the traditional Ottoman houses of Turkey

 
Medieval architecture
Architectural styles
Islamic architecture
Architecture in Turkey
14th-century architecture
15th-century architecture
16th-century architecture
17th-century architecture
18th-century architectural styles
19th-century architecture
20th-century architecture